= List of moths of Australia (Lacturidae) =

Partial list of Australian moths

This is a list of the Australian moth species of the family Lacturidae. It also acts as an index to the species articles and forms part of the full List of moths of Australia.

- Aictis erythrozona Turner, 1926
- Anticrates metreta (Turner, 1903)
- Anticrates paraxantha (Meyrick, 1907)
- Anticrates phaedima Turner, 1913
- Anticrates zapyra Meyrick, 1907
- Burlacena aegerioides Walker, 1865
- Eustixis aglaodora (Turner, 1942)
- Eustixis calliphylla (Turner, 1903)
- Eustixis caminaea (Meyrick, 1887)
- Eustixis cristata
- Eustixis dives (Walker, 1854)
- Eustixis erythocera (Walker, 1866)
- Eustixis erythractis (Meyrick, 1887)
- Eustixis haplochroa (Turner, 1932)
- Eustixis laetifera (Walker, [1865])
- Eustixis leucophthalma (Meyrick, 1907)
- Eustixis mactata (R. Felder & Rogenhofer, 1875)
- Eustixis panopsia (Turner, 1926)
- Eustixis parallela (Meyrick, 1889)
- Eustixis phoenobapta (Turner, 1903)
- Eustixis pilcheri (T.P. Lucas, 1891)
- Eustixis pteropoecila (Turner, 1913)
- Eustixis rhodomochla (Turner, 1942)
- Eustixis rubritexta (Meyrick, 1913)
- Eustixis sapotearum (Swainson, 1851)
- Eustixis thiospila
- Thyridectis psephonoma Meyrick, 1887
- Trychnomera anthemis Turner, 1913
