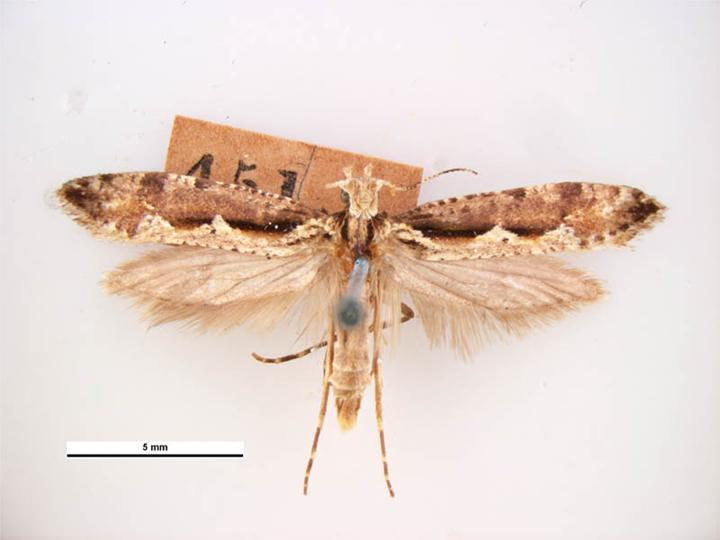

Scientific classification
- Domain: Eukaryota
- Kingdom: Animalia
- Phylum: Arthropoda
- Class: Insecta
- Order: Lepidoptera
- Family: Plutellidae
- Genus: Rhigognostis
- Species: R. annulatella

Binomial name
- Rhigognostis annulatella (Curtis, 1832)

Synonyms
- Cerostoma annulatella Curtis, 1832; Plutella bicingulata Zeller, 1839

= Rhigognostis annulatella =

Species of moth

Rhigognostis annulatella (ringed diamond-back or annulated smudge) is a moth of the family Plutellidae. It is found in most of Europe.

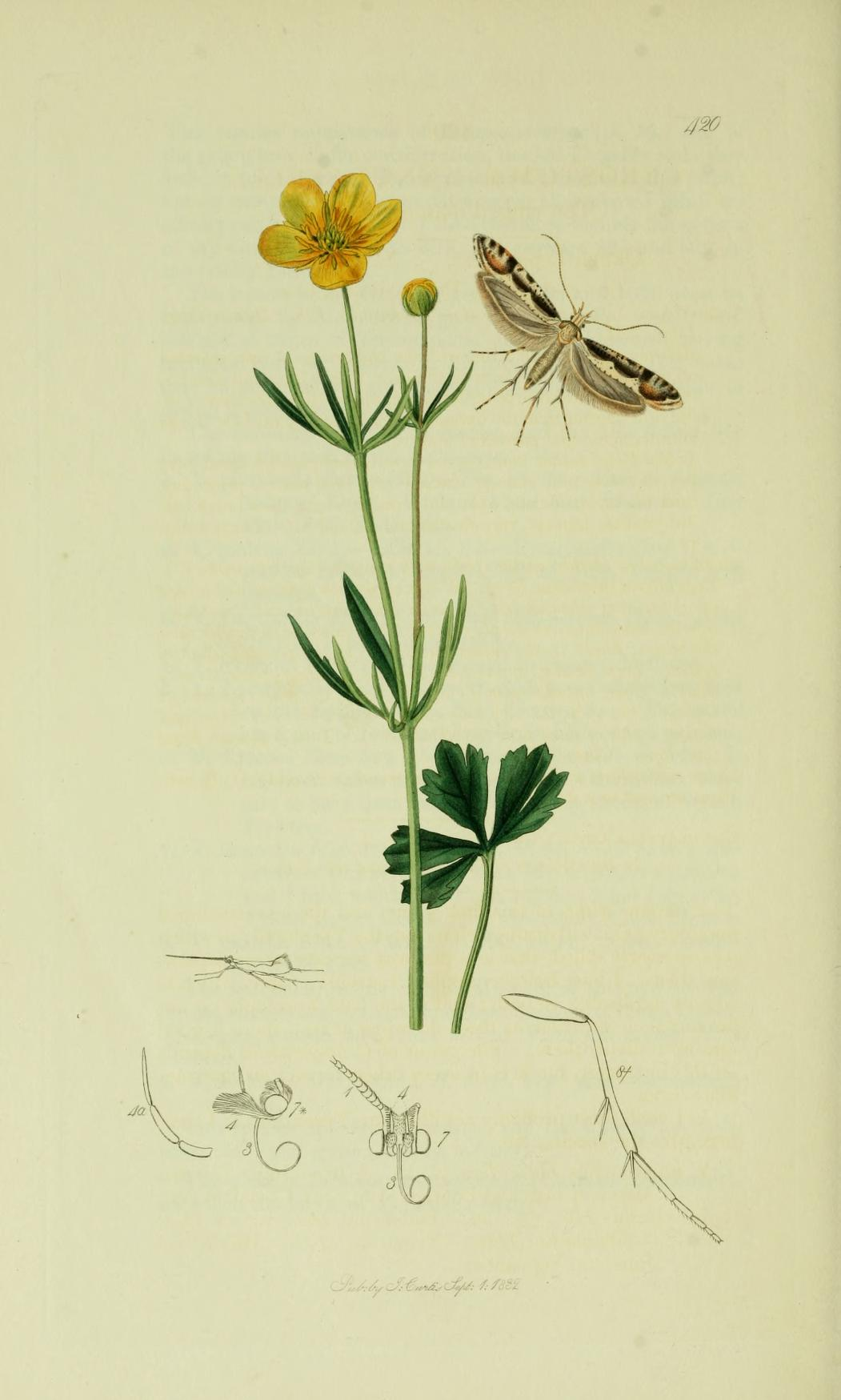
Illustration from John Curtis's British Entomology Volume 6

The wingspan is about 18 mm. The head is whitish, with some dark fuscous hairs. Tuft of palpi very short. Forewings light fuscous, much suffused with whitish - ochreous, with scattered dark fuscous strigulae; an ochreous-whitish dorsal streak from base to tornus, upper edge with triangular projections before and beyond middle, towards base blackish-edged. Hindwings are light grey. The larva is green; spots black, conspicuous; head and 2 black-speckled.

Adults are on wing from July onwards, and overwinter in this stage, occurring on the wing until April.

The larvae feed on Cochlearia officinalis.
