= Darantoides =

Scientific classification
- Kingdom: Animalia
- Phylum: Arthropoda
- Class: Insecta
- Order: Lepidoptera
- Superfamily: Noctuoidea
- Family: Erebidae
- Subfamily: Arctiinae
- Tribe: Lithosiini
- Genus: Darantoides; Hampson, 1900

Genus of moths

Darantoides is a genus of moths in the family Erebidae. The genus was erected by George Hampson in 1900.

== Species ==
- Darantoides rubroflava Hampson, 1900

== Former species ==
- Darantoides lineolata Hulstaert, 1924
- Darantoides plagiata Hulstaert, 1924
