= Anticrates chrysantha =

Scientific classification
- Kingdom: Animalia
- Phylum: Arthropoda
- Class: Insecta
- Order: Lepidoptera
- Family: Lacturidae
- Genus: Anticrates
- Species: A. chrysantha

Binomial name
- Anticrates chrysantha Meyrick, 1905

Species of moth

Anticrates chrysantha is a moth of the family Lacturidae first described by Edward Meyrick in 1905. It is found in Sri Lanka.
