= Pyrozela xanthomima =

Scientific classification
- Kingdom: Animalia
- Phylum: Arthropoda
- Class: Insecta
- Order: Lepidoptera
- Family: Lacturidae
- Genus: Anticrates
- Species: A. xanthomima

Binomial name
- Anticrates xanthomima Meyrick, 1906

Synonyms
- Anticrates xanthomima Meyrick, 1906

Species of moth

Pyrozela xanthomima is a moth of the family Heliodinidae first described by Edward Meyrick in 1906. It is found in Sri Lanka.
