= Rhigognostis hufnagelii =

Scientific classification
- Kingdom: Animalia
- Phylum: Arthropoda
- Clade: Pancrustacea
- Class: Insecta
- Order: Lepidoptera
- Family: Plutellidae
- Genus: Rhigognostis
- Species: R. hufnagelii

Binomial name
- Rhigognostis hufnagelii (Zeller, 1839)

Species of moth

Rhigognostis hufnagelii is a moth belonging to the family Plutellidae. The species was first described by Philipp Christoph Zeller in 1839.

It is native to Europe.
