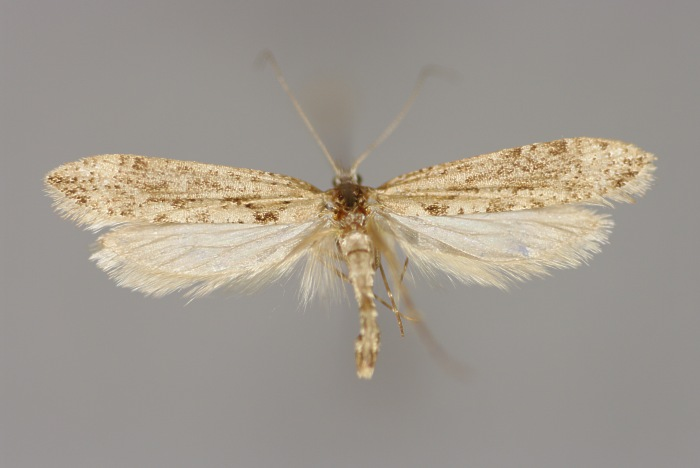

Scientific classification
- Kingdom: Animalia
- Phylum: Arthropoda
- Class: Insecta
- Order: Lepidoptera
- Family: Plutellidae
- Genus: Rhigognostis
- Species: R. senilella

Binomial name
- Rhigognostis senilella (Zetterstedt, 1839)

Synonyms
- Plutella senilella Zetterstedt, 1839; Plutella dalella Stainton, 1849; Plutella marmorisella Wocke, 1849; Plutella septentrionum Zeller, 1857

= Rhigognostis senilella =

Species of moth

Rhigognostis senilella, the rock-cress smudge, is a moth of the family Plutellidae. It is found in Iceland, Ireland, Great Britain, France, Germany, Denmark, Austria, Switzerland, Italy, the Czech Republic, Slovakia, Serbia, Hungary, Poland, Norway, Sweden, Finland, Latvia, Russia and on Sardinia. Outside of Europe, the range extends to the Caucasus, Central Asia and Japan. It is also found on Greenland. The habitat consists of rocky areas such as coastal or mountain areas.

The wingspan is 19–23 mm. The head is fuscous mixed with whitish. Tuft of palpi very short. Forewings are fuscous, somewhat whitish-marbled, more strongly posteriorly, with scattered blackish strigulae, especially on costa : a small whitish spot on dorsum towards base, a large triangular one about middle, and another before tornus, blackish -dotted on dorsal edge, dorsum between these dark fuscous. Hindwings are grey.

Adults are on wing from August to October and, after overwintering, from April to June.

The larvae feed on Descurainia sophia, Hesperis matronalis, Cardamine pratensis, Arabis, Draba and Brassica species. They feed from within a web.
