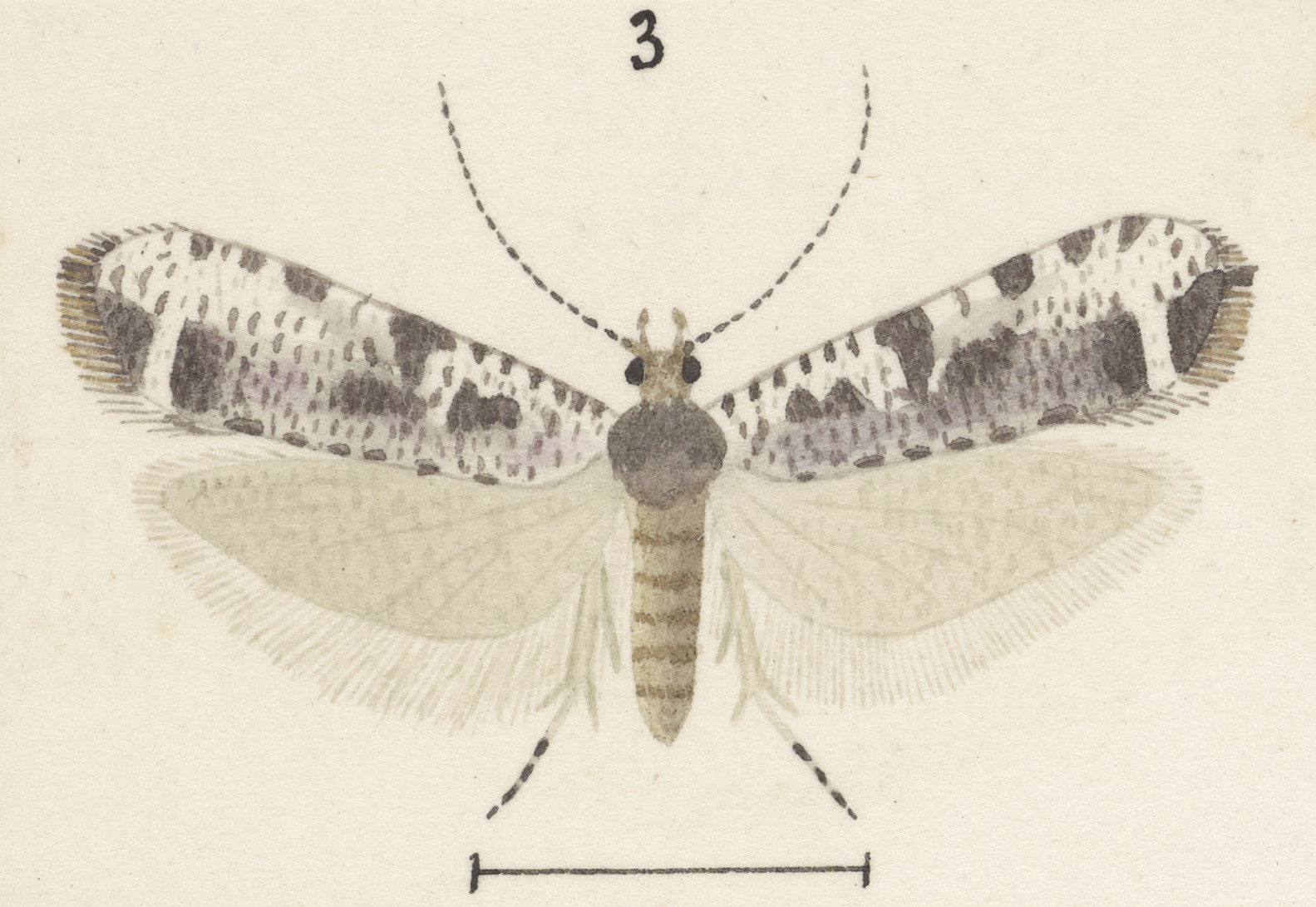
- Female

Scientific classification
- Kingdom: Animalia
- Phylum: Arthropoda
- Class: Insecta
- Order: Lepidoptera
- Family: Plutellidae
- Genus: Orthenches
- Species: O. semifasciata

Binomial name
- Orthenches semifasciata Philpott, 1915

= Orthenches semifasciata =

Species of moth

Orthenches semifasciata is a moth of the family Plutellidae. It is endemic to New Zealand.

== Taxonomy ==
This species was first described by Alfred Philpott in 1915. He used a female specimen collected by C. C. Fenwick which was taken in Queenstown in January. George Hudson discussed and illustrated this species in his 1928 book The Butterflies and Moths of New Zealand. In this book Hudson synonymised O. similis with O. semifasciata despite Philpott providing distinguishing features for these two species. In 1988 John S. Dugdale disagreed with this synonymising and separately listed the two species. The holotype specimen of O. semifasciata is held at the Museum of New Zealand Te Papa Tongarewa.

== Distribution ==
This species is endemic to New Zealand. Along with the type locality of Queenstown this species has also been collected near Lake Hakapoua in Fiordland National Park, on Mount Titiroa in Fiordland, at Rastus Burn Basin in The Remarkables at an altitude of 1640m, and around Aoraki/ Mount Cook.

== Biology and behaviour ==
This species has been recorded as being on the wing in January and February.

== Habitat and hosts ==
The larvae of O. semifasciata feed on Dracophyllum species.
