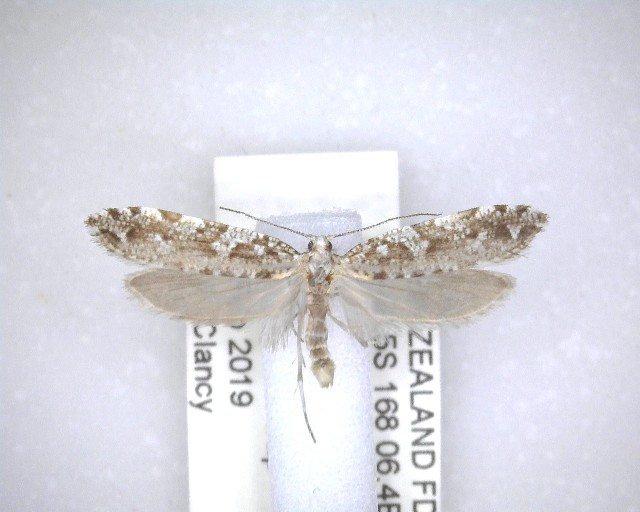

Scientific classification
- Kingdom: Animalia
- Phylum: Arthropoda
- Class: Insecta
- Order: Lepidoptera
- Family: Plutellidae
- Genus: Orthenches
- Species: O. dictyarcha

Binomial name
- Orthenches dictyarcha Meyrick, 1927

= Orthenches dictyarcha =

Species of moth endemic to New Zealand

Orthenches dictyarcha is a moth of the family Plutellidae first described by Edward Meyrick in 1927. It is endemic to New Zealand and has been observed at Arthur's Pass and at Hollyford Valley in Fiordland. It is one of the larger species in its genus and is similar in appearance to O. homerica. Its preferred habitat is beech forest and adults are on the wing in January.

== Taxonomy ==
This species was first described by Edward Meyrick in 1927 and named Orthenches dictyarcha using a male specimen collected at Arthur's Pass at 3000 ft. in January by George Hudson. Hudson discussed and illustrated this species in his 1939 book A supplement to the butterflies and moths of New Zealand. The female holotype specimen is held at the Natural History Museum, London.

== Description ==
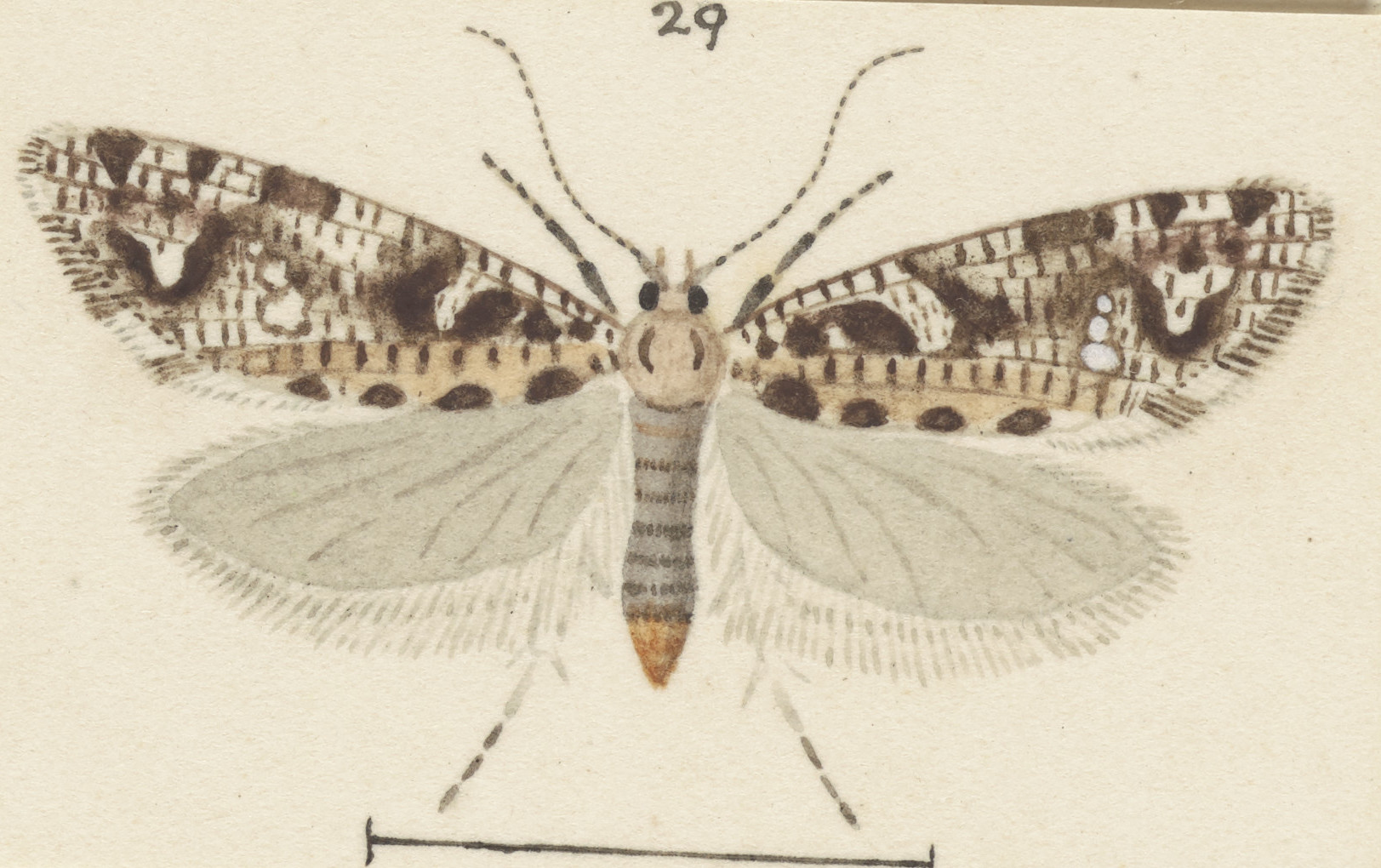
Illustration of male.

Meyrick described this species as follows:

♂ 19 mm. Head and thorax whity-brownish, face with a whitish bar. Palpi brown, apex of joints white, terminal joint not longer than second. Forewings rather narrow, slightly dilated, termen straight, rather strongly oblique; 7 to termen; white, veins and transverse strigulae dark fuscous, forming an irregular reticulation; five subtriangular dark fuscous spots on dorsum from ¼ to ¾, plical area suffused pale bronzy-ochreous above these; three very irregular oblique fuscous fasciae partially suffused dark fuscous on edges from costa at one-fifth, two-fifths, and three-fifths, terminated by plical suffusion; two dark fuscous spots on costa posteriorly, and a praemarginal streak before lower part of termen; cilia fuscous, a darker basal line, a white spot below apex, tornal area partly suffused whitish, costal cilia white barred dark fuscous. Hindwings 4–6 rather approximated towards base; pale grey; cilia grey-whitish.

This species is regarded as one of the largest in the genus. It is very similar in appearance to O. homerica.

== Distribution ==
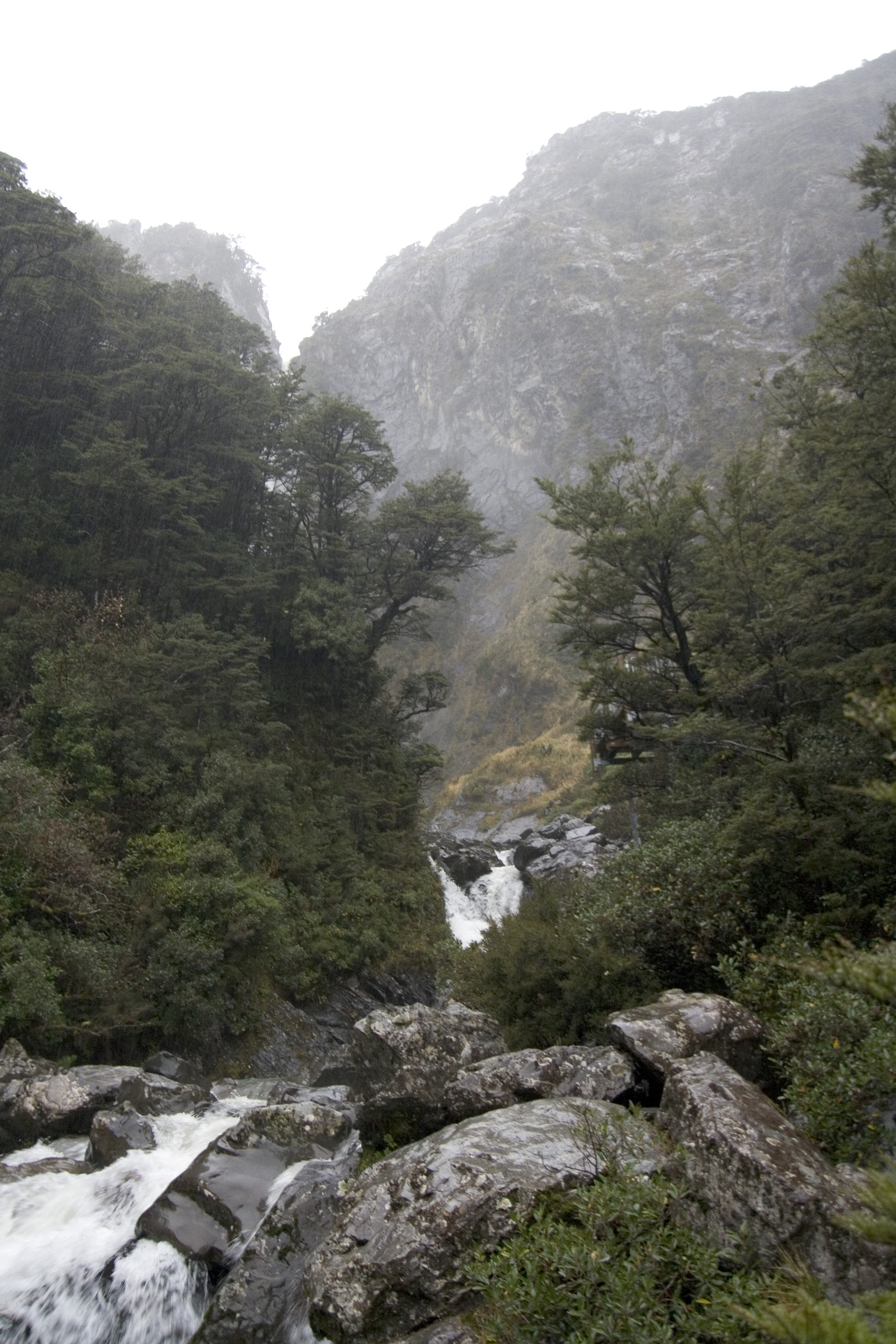
Beech forest habitat at Arthur's Pass

This species is endemic to New Zealand and has been observed at Arthur's Pass. It has also been collected in Fiordland at Milford Road, above lower Hollyford Valley.

== Habitat ==
This species frequents beech forest.

== Behaviour ==
Adults of O. dictyarcha are on the wing in January.
