= Anticrates crocophaea =

Scientific classification
- Kingdom: Animalia
- Phylum: Arthropoda
- Class: Insecta
- Order: Lepidoptera
- Family: Lacturidae
- Genus: Anticrates
- Species: A. crocophaea

Binomial name
- Anticrates crocophaea Meyrick, 1921

Species of moth

Anticrates crocophaea is a moth of the family Lacturidae. It is known from South Africa.
