= Eremothyris tabulatrix =

Scientific classification
- Kingdom: Animalia
- Phylum: Arthropoda
- Class: Insecta
- Order: Lepidoptera
- Family: Lacturidae
- Genus: Gymnogramma
- Species: G. tabulatrix

Binomial name
- Gymnogramma tabulatrix (Meyrick, 1930)

Synonyms
- Gymnogramma tabulatrix Meyrick, 1930

Species of moth

Eremothyris tabulatrix is a moth of the family Yponomeutidae. It is only known from Madagascar.

The wingspan is about 19 mm for the males and the holotype was provided from Île Sainte-Marie, an island off the east coast of Madagascar.
