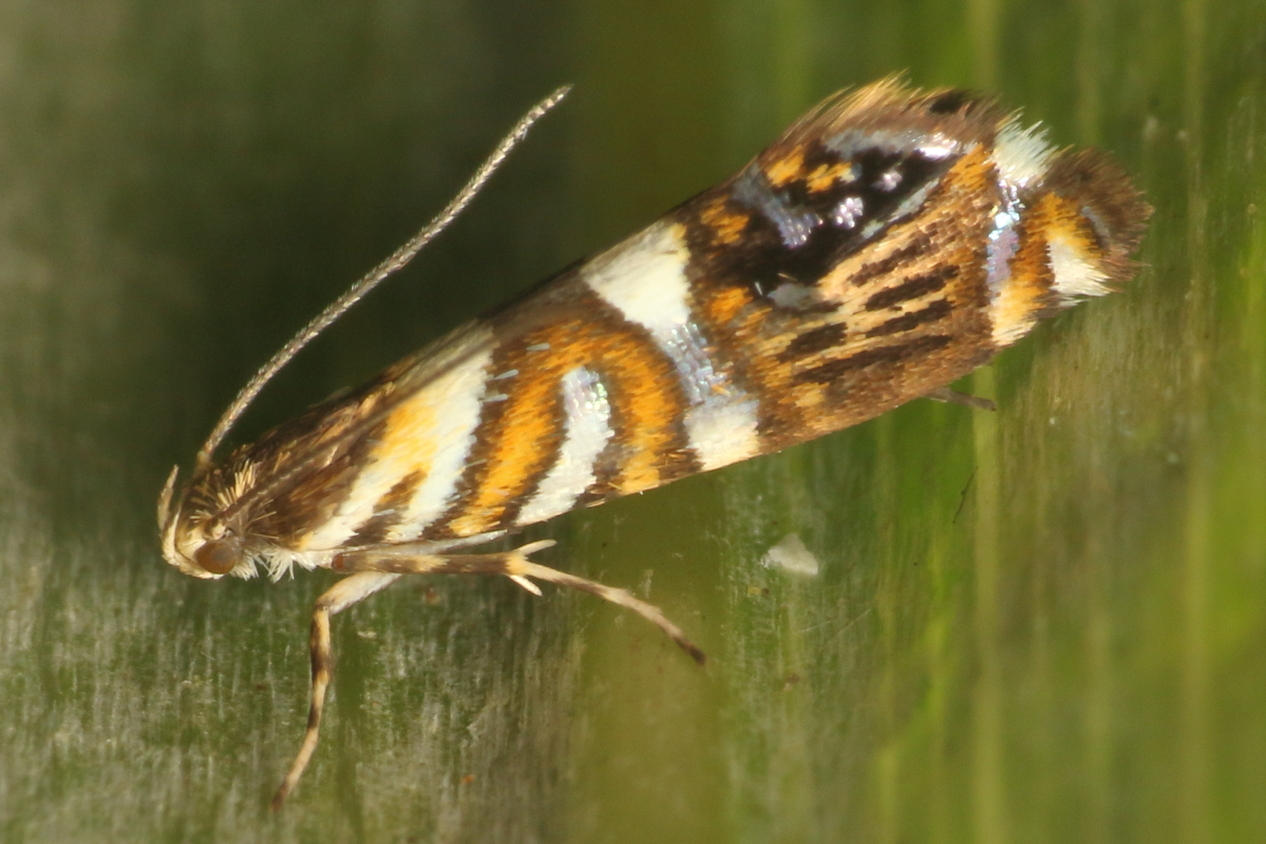

Scientific classification
- Kingdom: Animalia
- Phylum: Arthropoda
- Class: Insecta
- Order: Lepidoptera
- Family: Plutellidae
- Genus: Protosynaema
- Species: P. hymenopis

Binomial name
- Protosynaema hymenopis Meyrick, 1935

= Protosynaema hymenopis =

Species of moth endemic to New Zealand

Protosynaema hymenopis is a species of moth in the family Plutellidae first described by Edward Meyrick in 1935. It is endemic to New Zealand.
