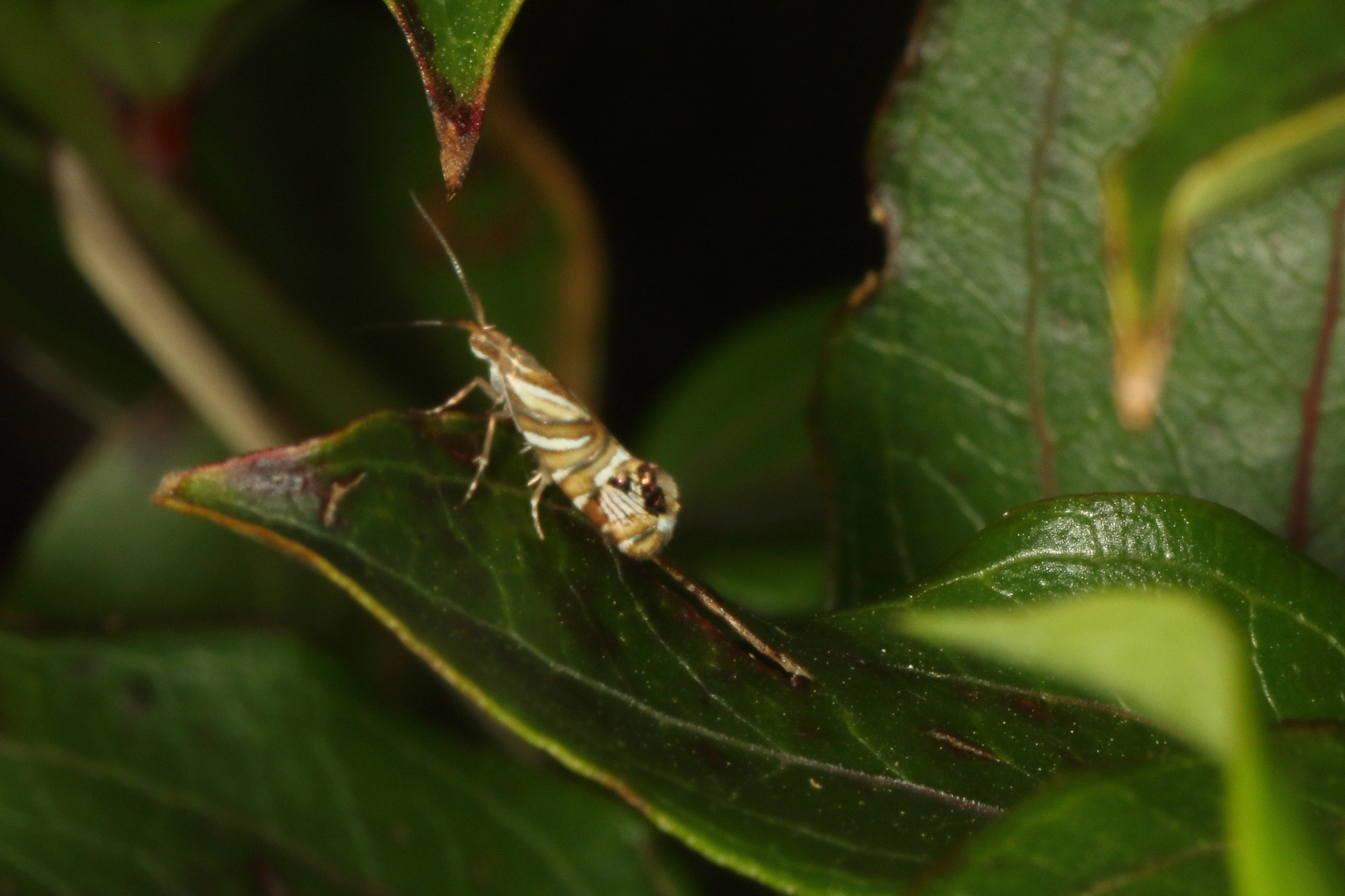
- Illustration of male

Scientific classification
- Kingdom: Animalia
- Phylum: Arthropoda
- Class: Insecta
- Order: Lepidoptera
- Family: Plutellidae
- Genus: Protosynaema
- Species: P. eratopis

Binomial name
- Protosynaema eratopis Meyrick, 1885

= Protosynaema eratopis =

Species of moth endemic to New Zealand

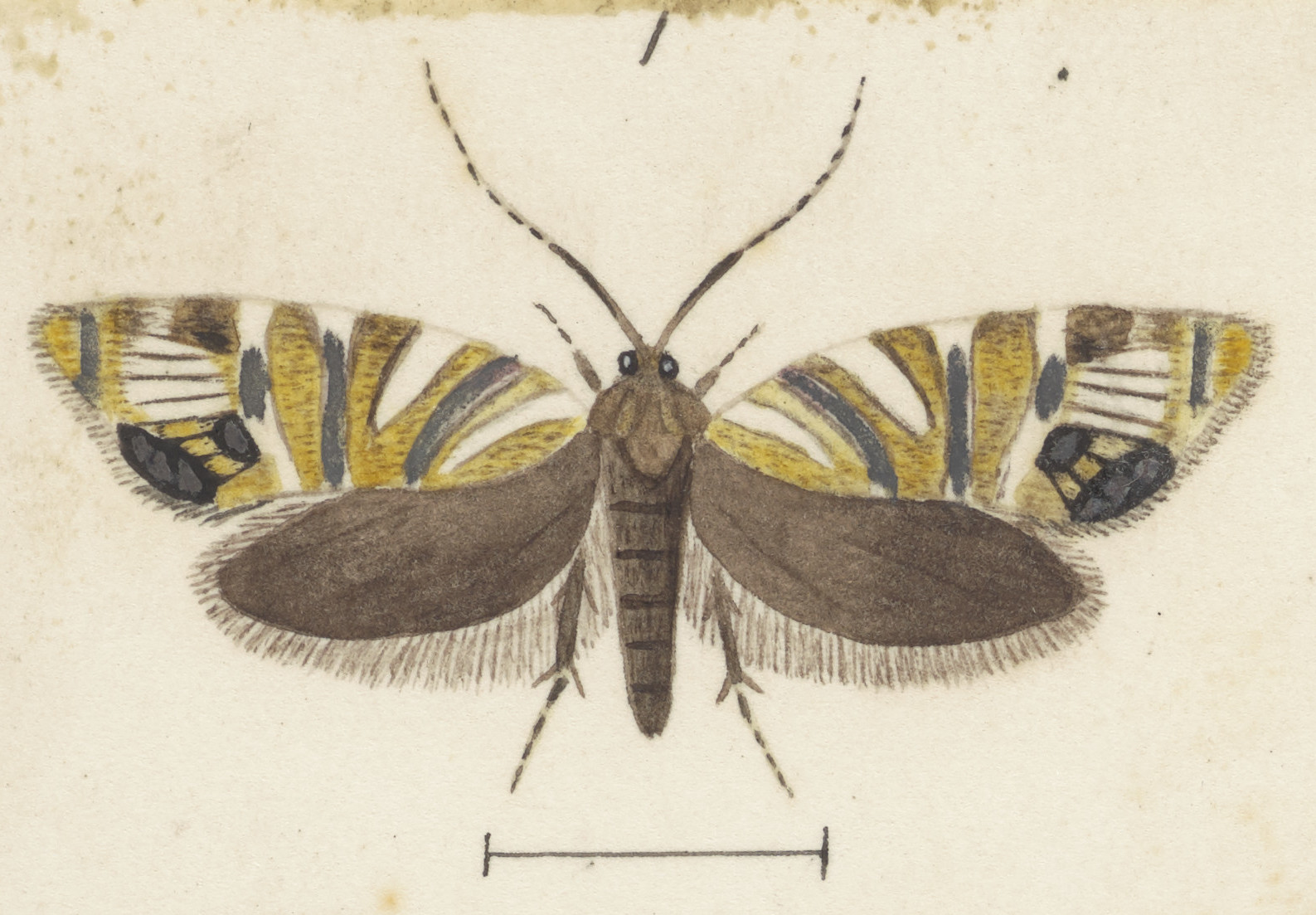
Illustration by George Hudson

Protosynaema eratopis is a species of moth in the family Plutellidae first described by Edward Meyrick in 1885. It is endemic to New Zealand.
