= Gymnogramma hollandi =

Scientific classification
- Domain: Eukaryota
- Kingdom: Animalia
- Phylum: Arthropoda
- Class: Insecta
- Order: Lepidoptera
- Family: Lacturidae
- Genus: Gymnogramma
- Species: G. hollandi

Binomial name
- Gymnogramma hollandi (Walsingham, 1897)

Synonyms
- Eremothyris hollandi Walsingham, 1897

Species of moth

Gymnogramma hollandi is a moth of the Lacturidae family. It is only known from the Republic of the Congo.

Antennae has a length of two-thirds of the forewings, basal joint enlarged, in the male biciliate. The forewings are stone grey. The forewings' expanse is 22–25 mm.

The type was provided from the Republic of the Congo, valley of the Ogooué River, Kangwé.
