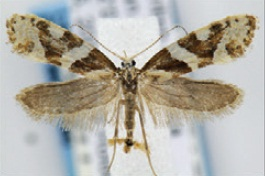

Scientific classification
- Domain: Eukaryota
- Kingdom: Animalia
- Phylum: Arthropoda
- Class: Insecta
- Order: Lepidoptera
- Family: Plutellidae
- Genus: Eidophasia
- Species: E. vanella

Binomial name
- Eidophasia vanella (Walsingham, 1881)

Synonyms
- Plutella vanella Walsingham, 1881

= Eidophasia vanella =

Species of moth

Eidophasia vanella is a moth of the family Plutellidae. It is found in North America from Alberta to California.

The length of the forewings is 7.5–8.5 mm.

The larvae feed on various plants, including Vicia gigantea and Osmorhiza species.
