= Eidophasia dammersi =

Scientific classification
- Kingdom: Animalia
- Phylum: Arthropoda
- Clade: Pancrustacea
- Class: Insecta
- Order: Lepidoptera
- Family: Plutellidae
- Genus: Eidophasia
- Species: E. dammersi

Binomial name
- Eidophasia dammersi (Busck, 1934)

Synonyms
- Plutella dammersi Busck, 1934

Species of moth

Eidophasia dammersi is a moth of the family Plutellidae. It is found in California and Arizona in the United States.

The larvae feed on Cleome isomeris.
