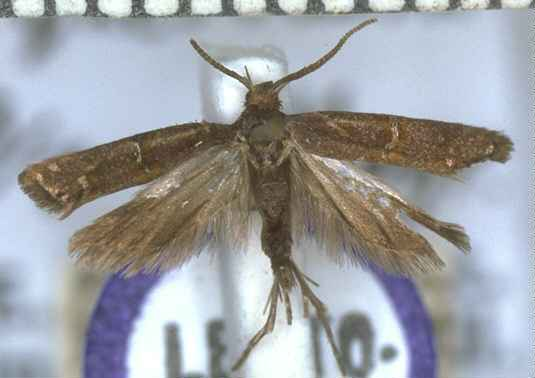
- Male lectotype

Scientific classification
- Kingdom: Animalia
- Phylum: Arthropoda
- Class: Insecta
- Order: Lepidoptera
- Family: Plutellidae
- Genus: Protosynaema
- Species: P. quaestuosa

Binomial name
- Protosynaema quaestuosa Meyrick, 1924

= Protosynaema quaestuosa =

Species of moth endemic to New Zealand

Protosynaema quaestuosa is a species of moth in the family Plutellidae first described by Edward Meyrick in 1924. It is endemic to New Zealand.
