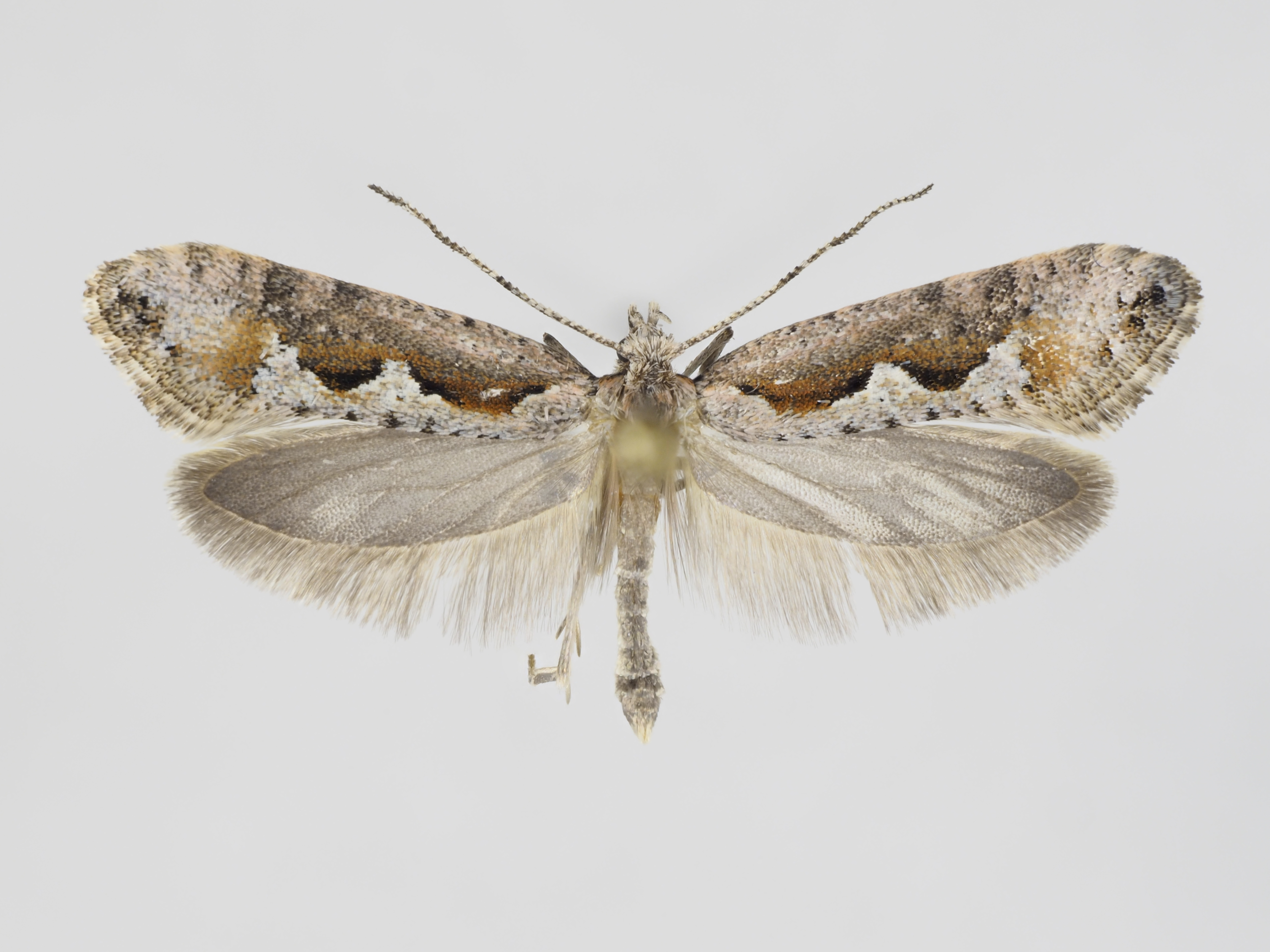

Scientific classification
- Domain: Eukaryota
- Kingdom: Animalia
- Phylum: Arthropoda
- Class: Insecta
- Order: Lepidoptera
- Family: Plutellidae
- Genus: Rhigognostis
- Species: R. kuusamoensis

Binomial name
- Rhigognostis kuusamoensis Kyrki, 1989

= Rhigognostis kuusamoensis =

Species of moth

Rhigognostis kuusamoensis is a species of moth belonging to the family Plutellidae.

It is native to Northern Europe.
