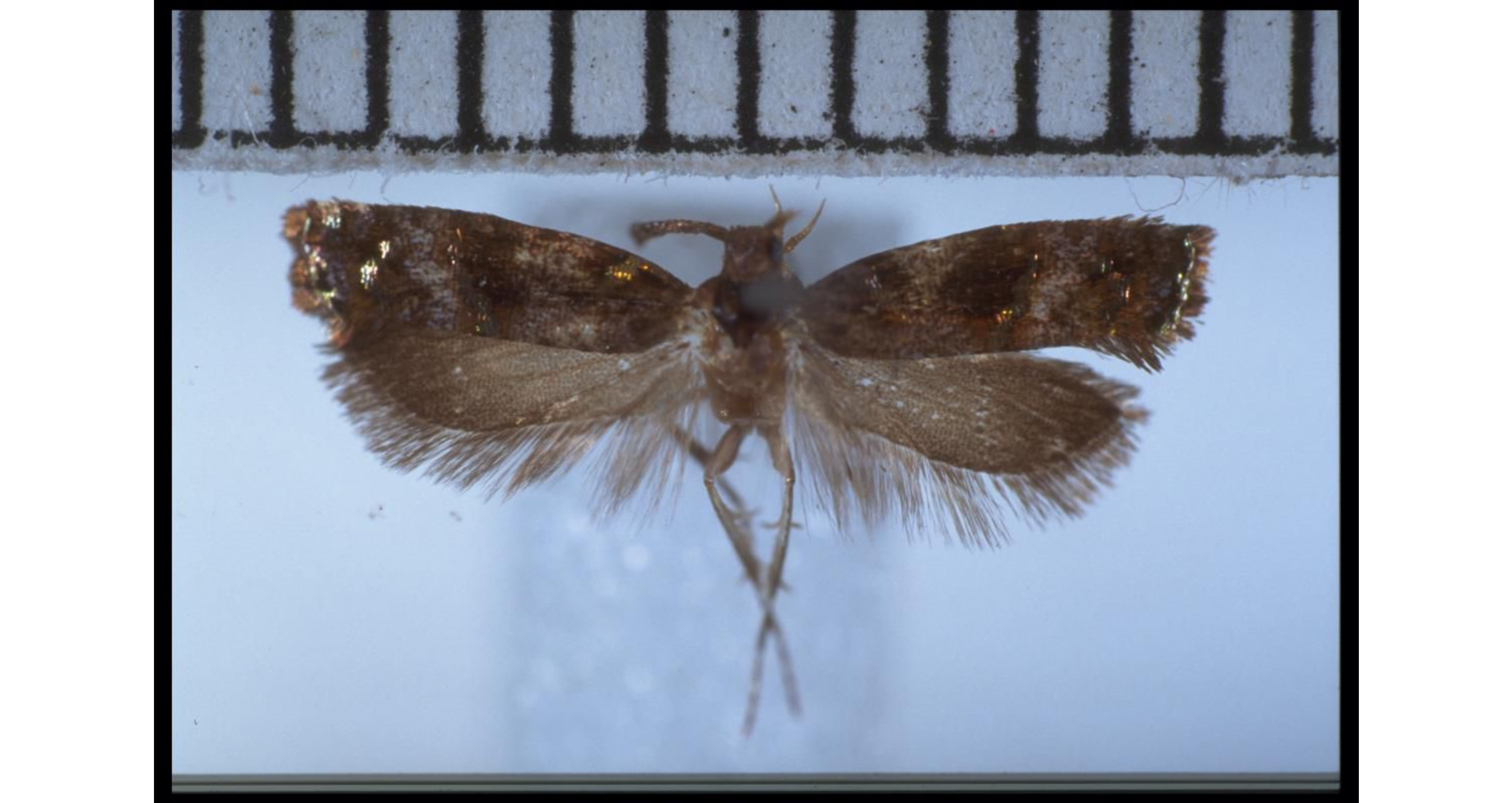

Scientific classification
- Kingdom: Animalia
- Phylum: Arthropoda
- Class: Insecta
- Order: Lepidoptera
- Family: Plutellidae
- Genus: Protosynaema
- Species: P. matutina

Binomial name
- Protosynaema matutina Philpott, 1928

= Protosynaema matutina =

Species of moth endemic to New Zealand

Protosynaema matutina is a species of moth in the family Plutellidae first described by Alfred Philpott in 1928. It is endemic to New Zealand.
