= Zarcinia melanozestas =

Scientific classification
- Kingdom: Animalia
- Phylum: Arthropoda
- Class: Insecta
- Order: Lepidoptera
- Family: Plutellidae
- Genus: Zarcinia
- Species: Z. melanozestas

Binomial name
- Zarcinia melanozestas Meyrick, 1935

Species of moth

Zarcinia melanozestas is a moth in the family Plutellidae. It is found in Russia.

The wingspan is 17–19 mm. The forewings are whitish-grey-ochreous or whitish-ochreous-grey with seven or eight dots along the costa. The hindwings are pale grey or whitish grey.
