= Gymnogramma candidella =

Scientific classification
- Kingdom: Animalia
- Phylum: Arthropoda
- Class: Insecta
- Order: Lepidoptera
- Family: Lacturidae
- Genus: Gymnogramma
- Species: G. candidella

Binomial name
- Gymnogramma candidella (Viette, 1963)

Synonyms
- Eremothyris candidella Viette, 1963

Species of moth

Gymnogramma candidella is a moth of the family Lacturidae. It was described in 1963 by French entomologist Pierre Viette and is only known from Madagascar.

This species has a wingspan of 32–37 mm. Antennae are grey yellowish. Head, palpi, abdomen and thorax are white. The forewings and hindwings are entirely white.

The types were provided from Antsalova in western Madagascar (II-1957).
