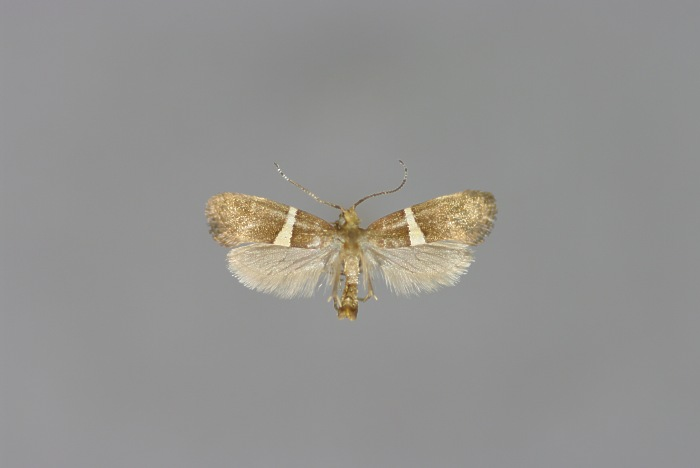

Scientific classification
- Kingdom: Animalia
- Phylum: Arthropoda
- Class: Insecta
- Order: Lepidoptera
- Family: Plutellidae
- Genus: Eidophasia
- Species: E. messingiella

Binomial name
- Eidophasia messingiella (Fischer von Röslerstamm, 1840)

Synonyms
- Plutella messingiella Fischer von Röslerstamm, 1840

= Eidophasia messingiella =

Species of moth

Eidophasia messingiella is a moth of the family Plutellidae. It is found in most of Europe (except Ireland, the Iberian Peninsula, Slovenia and Ukraine).

The wingspan is 14–16 mm. Adults are on wing from June to July in one generation per year.

The larvae feed on Cardaria draba, Cardamine amara and Lunaria rediviva.
