= Protosynaema steropucha =

Scientific classification
- Kingdom: Animalia
- Phylum: Arthropoda
- Clade: Pancrustacea
- Class: Insecta
- Order: Lepidoptera
- Family: Plutellidae
- Genus: Protosynaema
- Species: P. steropucha

Binomial name
- Protosynaema steropucha Meyrick, 1885

Species of moth endemic to New Zealand

Protosynaema steropucha, also known as the bronze black-horn, is a species of moth in the family Plutellidae. It was first described by Edward Meyrick in 1885. P. steropucha is endemic to New Zealand and can be found in the North and South Islands. Its preferred habitat is grassland, with the larvae feeding on the grass seed heads from a silken web woven amongst grass leaves. There are at least two broods in a year with some remaining in the pupal stage over winter. This species pupates in a cocoon constructed of fine white silk attached to a firm object. The cocoon and pupa give the appearance of a grass seed.

Adults are on the wing from August until May and are most frequently observed between September and April. There is much variation in the depth of colouring with some specimens being very much paler than others. Adults are sluggish and seldom fly but can usually be seen walking or resting on leaves. When at rest this moth resembles a weevil.

== Taxonomy ==
This species was first described by Edward Meyrick in 1885 using specimens collected at Hamilton and Christchurch. Meyrick gave a fuller description of the species in 1886. In 1927 Alfred Philpott discussed and illustrated the male genitalia of this species. George Hudson discussed and illustrated this species in his 1928 book The butterflies and moths of New Zealand. The male lectotype, collected at the sandhills in Kaiapoi, is held at the Natural History Museum, London.

== Description ==
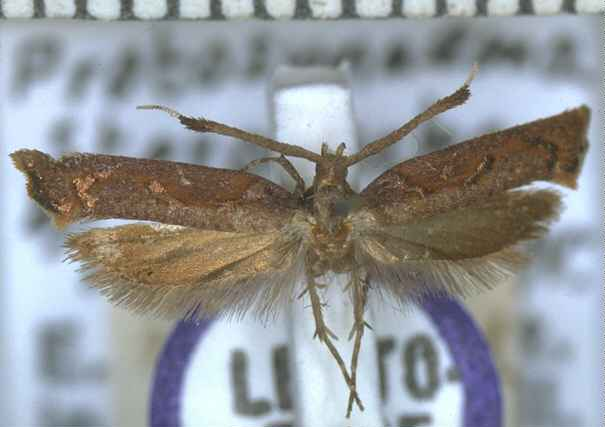
P. steropucha lectotype.

Adult moth at rest.

Meyrick described the adults of this species as follows:

Male, female. — 13-14 mm. Head and thorax dark purplish-fuscous, palpi dark fuscous, second joint yellow-whitish beneath towards base. Antennae, clothed with very dense scales in male to 3/4 , in female to 2/3, dark purplish-fuscous, naked apical portion yellow- whitish. Abdomen dark grey. Legs dark purplish-fuscous. Forewings elongate, narrow, apex round-pointed, hindmargin sinuate, oblique ; deep ferruginous-bronze, with purplish reflections, finely irrregularly irrorated with dark grey and whitish ; markings coppery-metallic ; a very oblique streak from costa near base to fold ; an irregular transverse mark parallel to hind-margin in middle of disc, in female reaching costa in middle, and then appearing as a curved fascia not reaching inner margin ; a transverse angulated fascia from beneath costa at 3/4 to above anal angle, not reaching margins ; a hindmarginal fascia, containing two small round deep black spots above anal angle : cilia deep ferruginous-bronze, mixed with dark grey. Hindwings dark fuscous-grey, lighter towards base, sometimes coppery-tinged ; cilia grey.

There is much variation in the depth of colouring with some specimens being very much paler than others. In these pale forms the usually very obscure darker markings are much more distinct. Hudson noted finding a specimen where the veins on the fore-wings were marked with suffused white lines.

Hudson described the larva as follows:

The larva, which feeds on grasses, is about five-sixteenths of an inch in length, elongate, much attenuated posteriorly, pale brown or green, much paler beneath with three or four darker lines on each side and a straight, pale, broad dorsal line. There are numerous transverse wrinkles, and a number of isolated black bristles on the larva. The head is pale yellowish with four of the most conspicuous lateral brownish lines continued thereon.

Hudson described the pupa as follows:

The pupa is slightly over 1/4 inch in length; rather elongate with a very large and rugged cremaster; pale ochreous with the head and extremity slightly darker; there are two greyish-brown streaks on the wing-cases; a row of large black spots down the back and a similar row on each side, one spot being placed on each segment. The cremaster is horny, brownish-black, with blunt extremity and side process, both being furnished with several crooked bristles.

The cocoon is constructed of fine white silk. It is attached to any firm object, is elliptical, very pointed at each end. The silk is thin and the black spots on the back and sides of the pupa can clearly be seen within the cocoon with the outline of the pupa being dimly visible. The appearance of the cocoon and the enclosed pupa give the impression of a large grass seed.

== Distribution ==
P. steropucha is endemic to New Zealand. It has been observed in the North and South Islands.

== Habitat and hosts ==
The preferred habitat is grassland. The larvae feed on the seed heads of grass species.

== Life cycle and behaviour ==
The larva spins an irregular web amongst the grass, is very active, and wriggles to and fro along the leaves. There are at least two broods in a year with some remaining in the pupal stage over winter. Adults are on the wing from August until May and are most frequently observed between September and April. Adults are sluggish and seldom fly but can usually be seen walking or resting on leaves. They are attracted to light. When at rest the wings are closed on each side of the body forming a steep roof with the moth standing on all its legs which are held close to the body. The thickened antennae are projected directly in front of the head with the tips slightly divergent. In this position the moth resemblances a weevil (Hudson was of the opinion it resembles Rhadinosomus acuminatus) with the thickened portions of the antennae forming the rostrum and the divergent tips the antennae of the weevil.

== Gallery of illustrations ==
Larva

Larva

Pupa

Adult
