= Helenodes murmurata =

Scientific classification
- Domain: Eukaryota
- Kingdom: Animalia
- Phylum: Arthropoda
- Class: Insecta
- Order: Lepidoptera
- Family: Plutellidae
- Genus: Helenodes
- Species: H. murmurata

Binomial name
- Helenodes murmurata Meyrick, 1913

Species of moth

Helenodes murmurata is a species of moth in the family Plutellidae.

This species is known from Assam, India, and has a wingspan of 13–16 mm.
