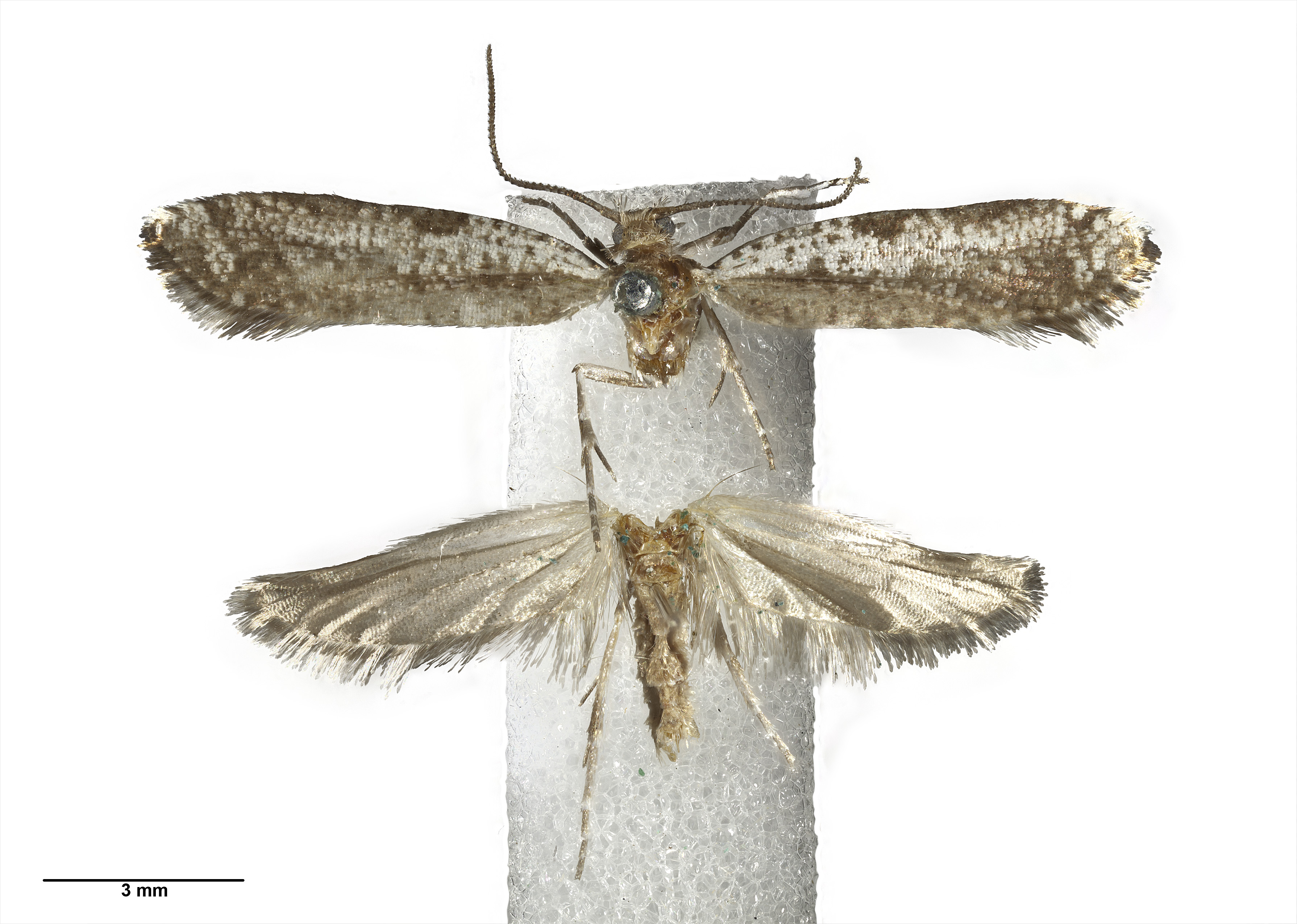
- Male holotype species

Scientific classification
- Kingdom: Animalia
- Phylum: Arthropoda
- Class: Insecta
- Order: Lepidoptera
- Family: Plutellidae
- Genus: Orthenches
- Species: O. septentrionalis

Binomial name
- Orthenches septentrionalis Philpott, 1930

= Orthenches septentrionalis =

Species of moth endemic to New Zealand

Orthenches septentrionalis is a moth of the family Plutellidae first described by Alfred Philpott in 1930. It is endemic to New Zealand.
