= Gymnogramma pyrozancla =

Scientific classification
- Kingdom: Animalia
- Phylum: Arthropoda
- Class: Insecta
- Order: Lepidoptera
- Family: Lacturidae
- Genus: Gymnogramma
- Species: G. pyrozancla

Binomial name
- Gymnogramma pyrozancla (Meyrick, 1911)

Species of moth

Gymnogramma pyrozancla is a moth in the genus Gymnogramma. It is in the family Lacturidae.

== Distribution ==
Gymnogramma pyrozancla occurs in South Africa.
