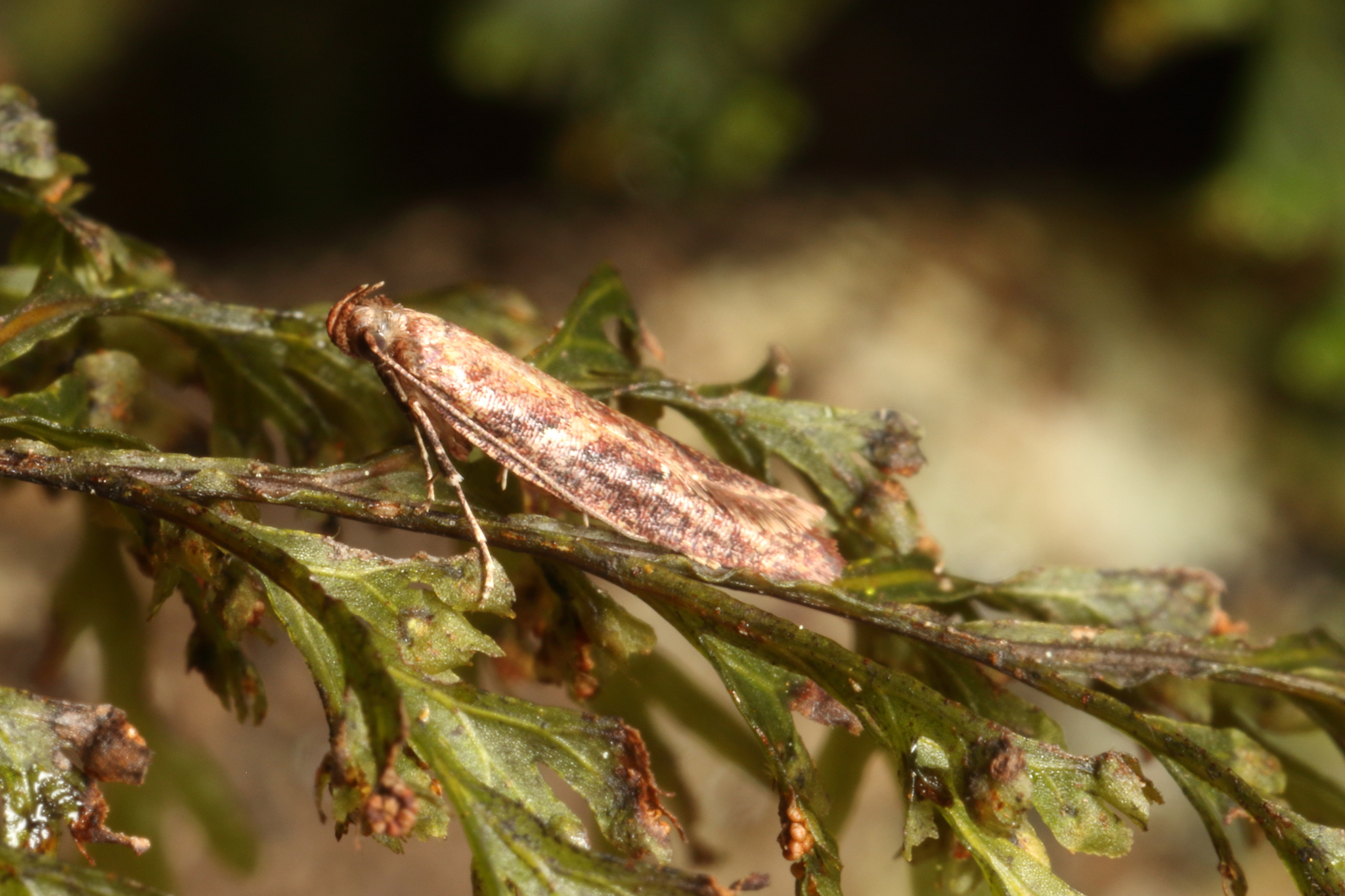

Scientific classification
- Kingdom: Animalia
- Phylum: Arthropoda
- Clade: Pancrustacea
- Class: Insecta
- Order: Lepidoptera
- Family: Plutellidae
- Genus: Cadmogenes; Meyrick, 1923
- Species: C. literata

Binomial name
- Cadmogenes literata Meyrick, 1923

= Cadmogenes =

Genus of moths

Cadmogenes is a genus of moths of the family Plutellidae. It contains only one species, Cadmogenes literata, which is found in New Zealand. This species is endemic to New Zealand. It has been classified as "Not Threatened" by the Department of Conservation.

== Taxonomy ==
The genus Cadmogenes was described in the family Plutellidae, but is considered an enigmatic unplaced genus (along with the genus Titanomis) and may require its own family.

Cadmogenes literata was first described by Edward Meyrick in 1923 using specimens collected at Silverstream and Auckland in January. George Hudson described and illustrated this species in his 1928 book The Butterflies and Moths of New Zealand. The lectotype specimen was collected at Kauri Gully, Birkenhead, Auckland by George Hudson and is held at the Natural History Museum, London.

== Description ==
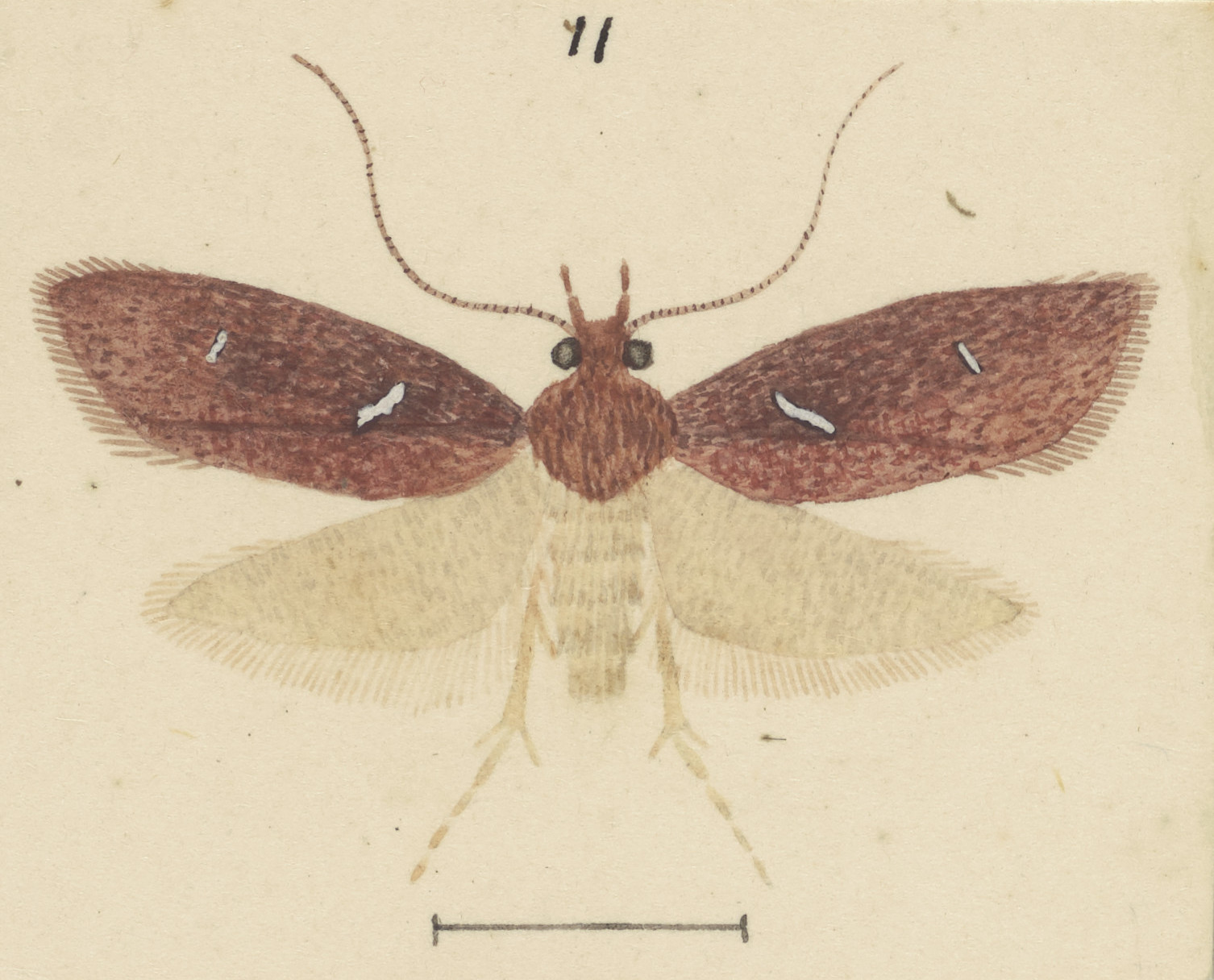
Illustration of C. literata by G. Hudson.

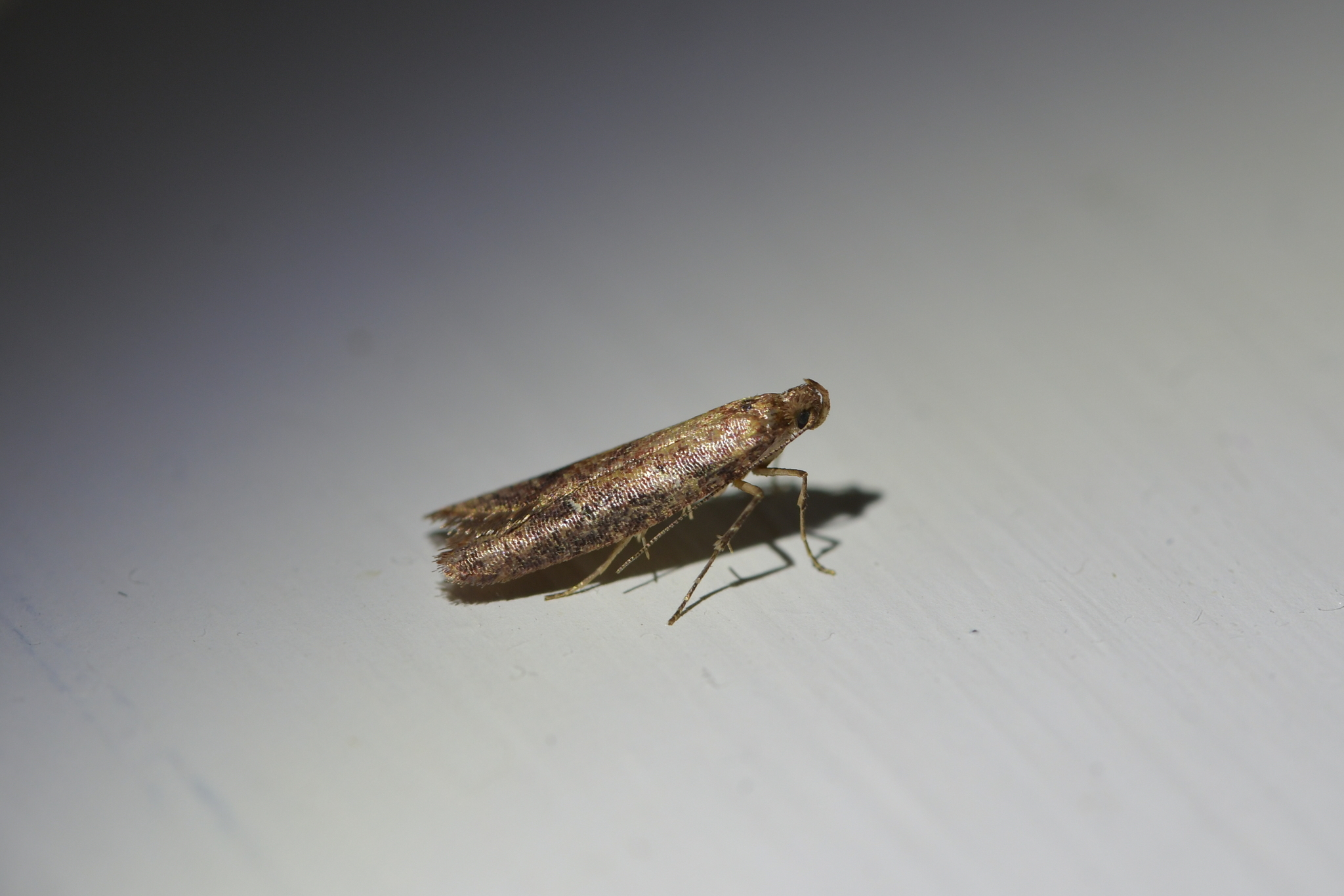
Observation of live C. literata.

Meyrick described the species as follows:

♂︎. 15-17 mm. Head and thorax dull rosy or purple-fuscous. Palpi rosy irrorated with dark fuscous, tip whitish. Abdomen light-greyish. Forewings elongate, costa gently arched, apex obtuse-pointed, very slightly prominent, termen rounded, rather strongly oblique; dull crimson suffusedly speckled with dark grey and irregularly marbled and strigulated with pale ochreous-yellowish, or purple-fuscous obscurely dotted and strigulated with whitish; discal stigmata represented by irregular transverse-linear sometimes interrupted white partially dark-edged marks : cilia light rosy or violet-grey. Hindwings pale grey; cilia whitish-grey, with very faint rosy or purple tinge.

The wing venation of the adult moth differs depending on whether the larva is reared from Pterophylla or Caldcluvia inflorescences.

== Distribution ==
This species is endemic to New Zealand. C. literata occurs in the Northland, Auckland, Taupo, Taranaki and Wellington areas.

== Host species and biology ==
The larvae feed on the flowers of Caldcluvia and Weinmannia species. There is one generation per year. The type locality of Kauri Gully now has few Weinmannia trees but these are abundant at Silverstream.

== Conservation status ==
This species has been classified as having the "Not Threatened" conservation status under the New Zealand Threat Classification System.
