= Nosymna =

Scientific classification
- Kingdom: Animalia
- Phylum: Arthropoda
- Class: Insecta
- Order: Lepidoptera
- Family: Lacturidae
- Genus: Nosymna; Walker, 1864

Type species
- Nosymna repletella Walker, 1864

Species
- See text

Genus of moths

Nosymna is a genus of moths of the family Yponomeutidae.

== Species ==
- Nosymna lapillata - Meyrick,
- Nosymna macrorrhyncha - Meyrick, 1930
- Nosymna obnubila - Durrant, 1916
- Nosymna ochrochorda - Meyrick, 1924
- Nosymna punctata - Walsingham, 1900
- Nosymna repletella - Walker, 1864
- Nosymna stipella - Snellen, 1903
