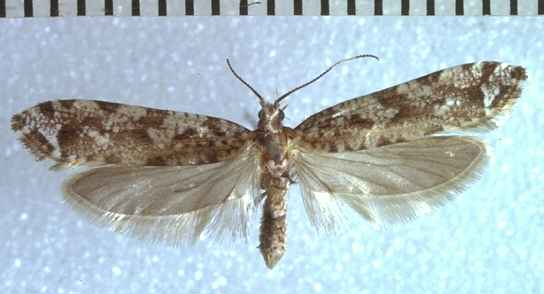
- Male holotype

Scientific classification
- Kingdom: Animalia
- Phylum: Arthropoda
- Class: Insecta
- Order: Lepidoptera
- Family: Plutellidae
- Genus: Orthenches
- Species: O. homerica

Binomial name
- Orthenches homerica (Salmon, 1956)

Synonyms
- Archyala homerica Salmon, 1956

= Orthenches homerica =

Species of moth endemic to New Zealand

Orthenches homerica is a moth of the family Plutellidae first described by John Salmon in 1956. It is endemic to New Zealand.
