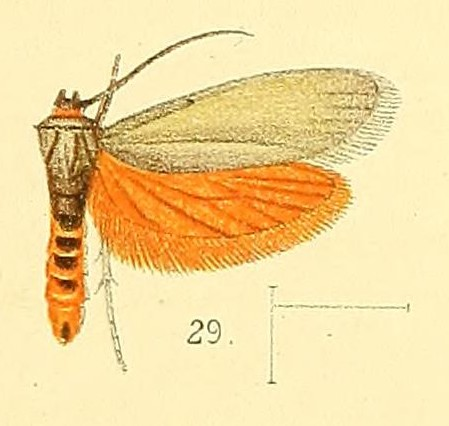
- Gymnogramma hutchinsoni

Scientific classification
- Kingdom: Animalia
- Phylum: Arthropoda
- Clade: Pancrustacea
- Class: Insecta
- Order: Lepidoptera
- Family: Lacturidae
- Genus: Gymnogramma; Zeller, 1852

Species
- See text

Synonyms
- Eremothyris Walsingham, 1897

= Gymnogramma =

Genus of moths

Gymnogramma is a genus of moths in the family Lacturidae.

Type species: Gymnogramma rufiventris (Zeller, 1852)

== Species ==
Some species of this genus are:

- Gymnogramma atmocycla Meyrick, 1918
- Gymnogramma candidella (Viette, 1963)
- Gymnogramma cyanea Meyrick, 1912
- Gymnogramma eoxantha Meyrick, 1921
- Gymnogramma flavivitella (Walsingham, 1881)
- Gymnogramma griveaudi (Gibeaux, 1982)
- Gymnogramma hollandi (Walsingham, 1897)
- Gymnogramma hutchinsoni Walsingham, 1891
- Gymnogramma iambiodella (Viette, 1958)
- Gymnogramma luctuosa (Gibeaux, 1982)
- Gymnogramma plagiula Meyrick, 1923
- Gymnogramma privata Meyrick, 1924
- Gymnogramma psyllodecta Meyrick, 1924
- Gymnogramma pyrozancla Meyrick, 1911
- Gymnogramma racemosa Meyrick, 1918
- Gymnogramma ratovosoni (Gibeaux, 1982)
- Gymnogramma rhodoneura Meyrick, 1909
- Gymnogramma rufiventris (Zeller, 1852)
- Gymnogramma sphaerobola Meyrick, 1924
- Gymnogramma tabulatrix Meyrick, 1930
- Gymnogramma toulgoeti (Gibeaux, 1982)
- Gymnogramma viettei (Gibeaux, 1982)
