= Darantoides rubroflava =

Scientific classification
- Kingdom: Animalia
- Phylum: Arthropoda
- Class: Insecta
- Order: Lepidoptera
- Superfamily: Noctuoidea
- Family: Erebidae
- Subfamily: Arctiinae
- Genus: Darantoides
- Species: D. rubroflava

Binomial name
- Darantoides rubroflava Hampson, 1900

Species of moth

Darantoides rubroflava is a moth of the family Erebidae. It was described by George Hampson in 1900. It is found in New Guinea.
