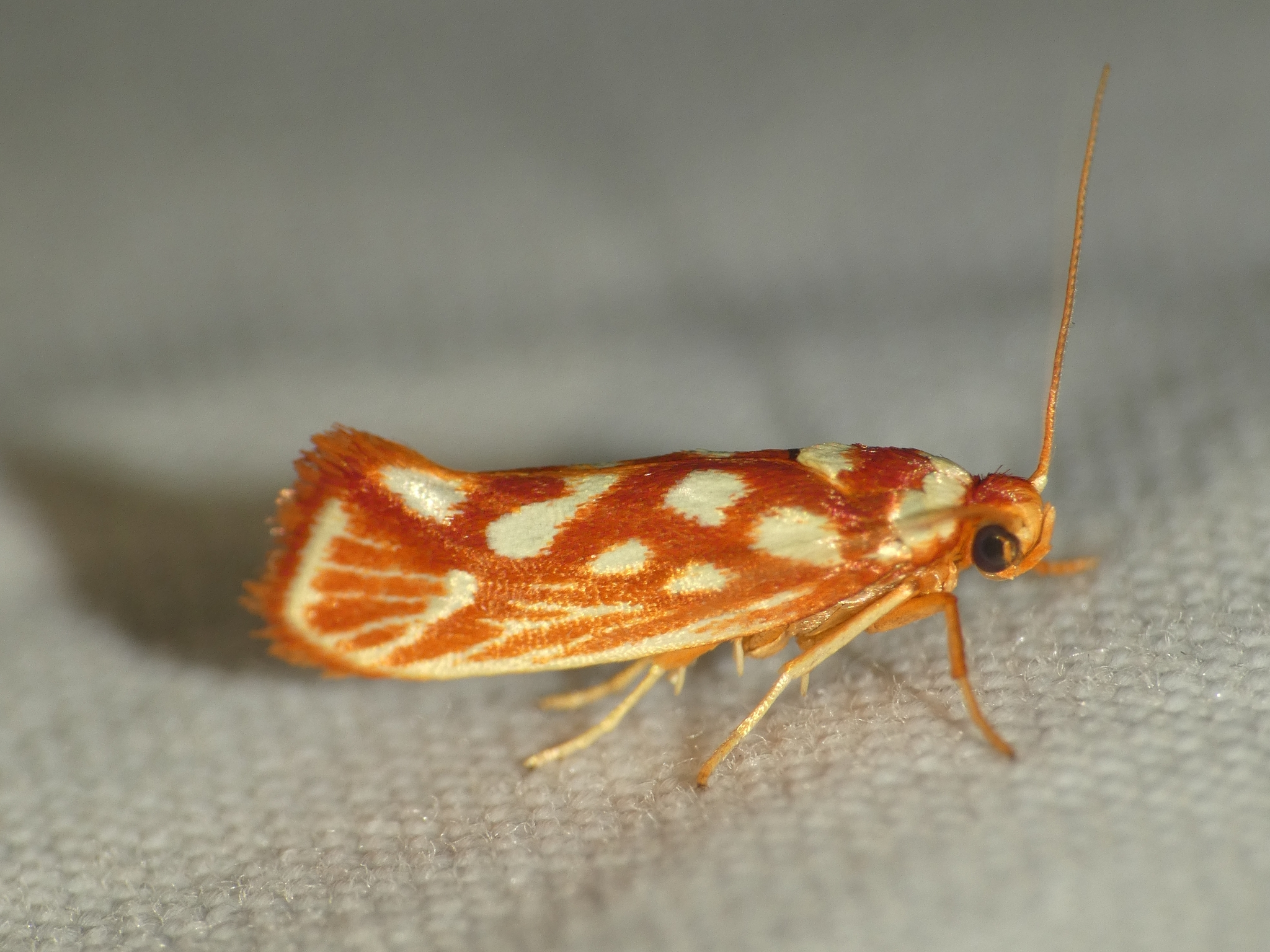

Scientific classification
- Kingdom: Animalia
- Phylum: Arthropoda
- Clade: Pancrustacea
- Class: Insecta
- Order: Lepidoptera
- Family: Lacturidae
- Genus: Anticrates
- Species: A. zapyra

Binomial name
- Anticrates zapyra Meyrick, 1907

= Anticrates zapyra =

Species of moth

Anticrates zapyra is a species of moth in the family Lacturidae. It is known from Australia, including Queensland.
