= Tonza =

Scientific classification
- Kingdom: Animalia
- Phylum: Arthropoda
- Clade: Pancrustacea
- Class: Insecta
- Order: Lepidoptera
- Family: Plutellidae
- Genus: Tonza; Walker, 1864

Species
- See text

Genus of moths

Tonza is a genus of moths in the family Plutellidae or Tonzidae.

== Species ==
- Tonza callicitra Meyrick 1913 (from Solomon Islands, New Guinea, New Ireland, New Britain)
- Tonza citrorrhoa Meyrick, 1905 (Taiwan)
- Tonza purella Walker, 1864 (Australia)
- Tonza toga Bippus, 2020 (Réunion)

== Former species ==
- Tonza circumdatella Walker, 1864 (Australia)
