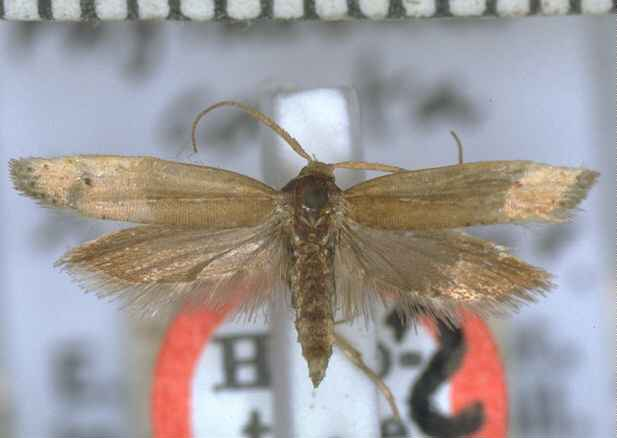
- Illustration of male

Scientific classification
- Kingdom: Animalia
- Phylum: Arthropoda
- Clade: Pancrustacea
- Class: Insecta
- Order: Lepidoptera
- Family: Plutellidae
- Genus: Phylacodes; Meyrick, 1905
- Species: P. cauta

Binomial name
- Phylacodes cauta Meyrick, 1905

= Phylacodes =

Genus of moths

Phylacodes cauta is a moth of the family Plutellidae first described by Edward Meyrick in 1905. It is the only species in the genus Phylacodes. It is endemic to New Zealand.
