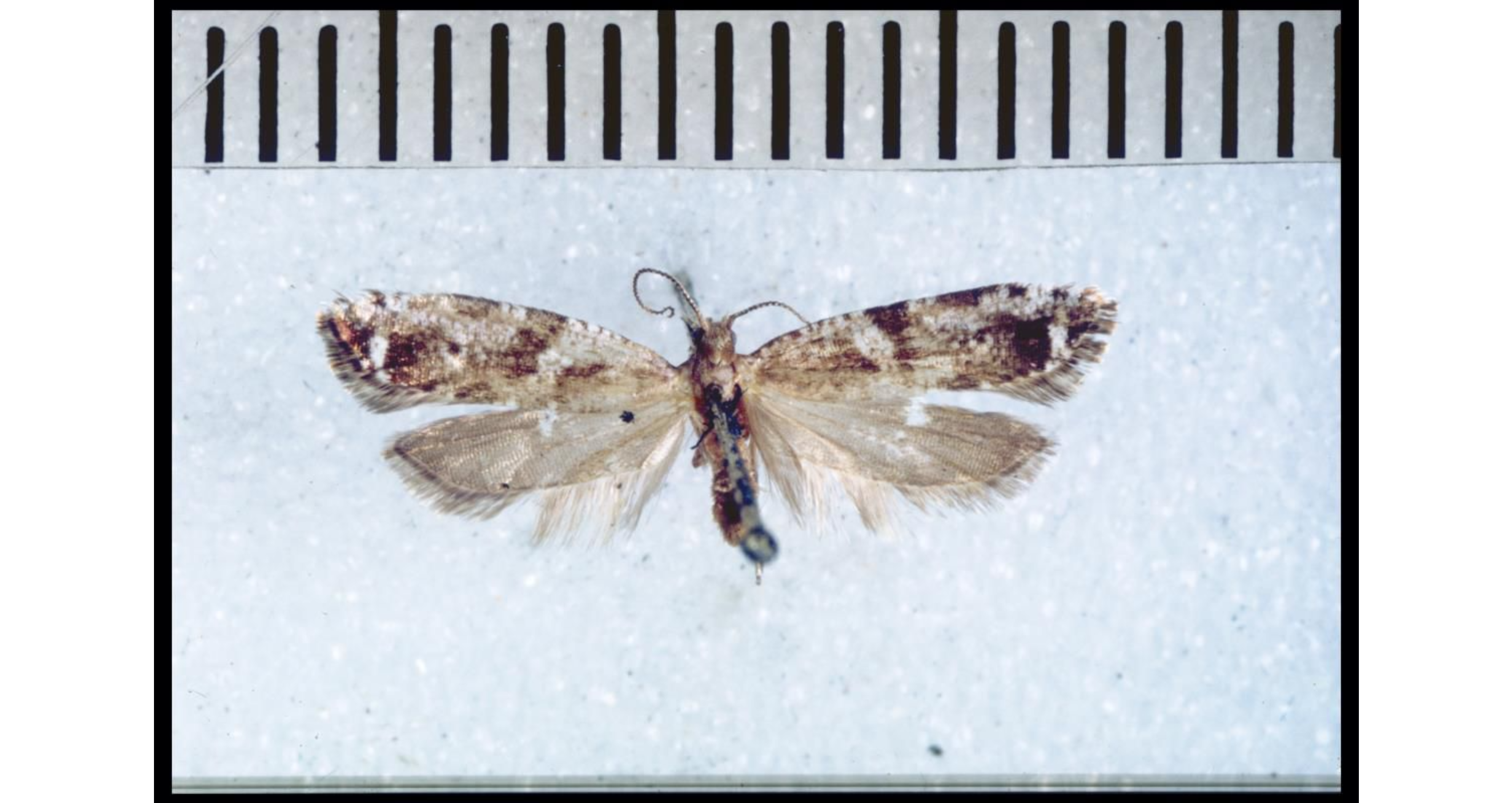
- Holotype

Scientific classification
- Kingdom: Animalia
- Phylum: Arthropoda
- Class: Insecta
- Order: Lepidoptera
- Family: Plutellidae
- Genus: Orthenches
- Species: O. similis

Binomial name
- Orthenches similis Philpott, 1924

= Orthenches similis =

Species of moth endemic to New Zealand

Orthenches similis is a moth of the family Plutellidae first described by Alfred Philpott in 1924. It is endemic to New Zealand.
