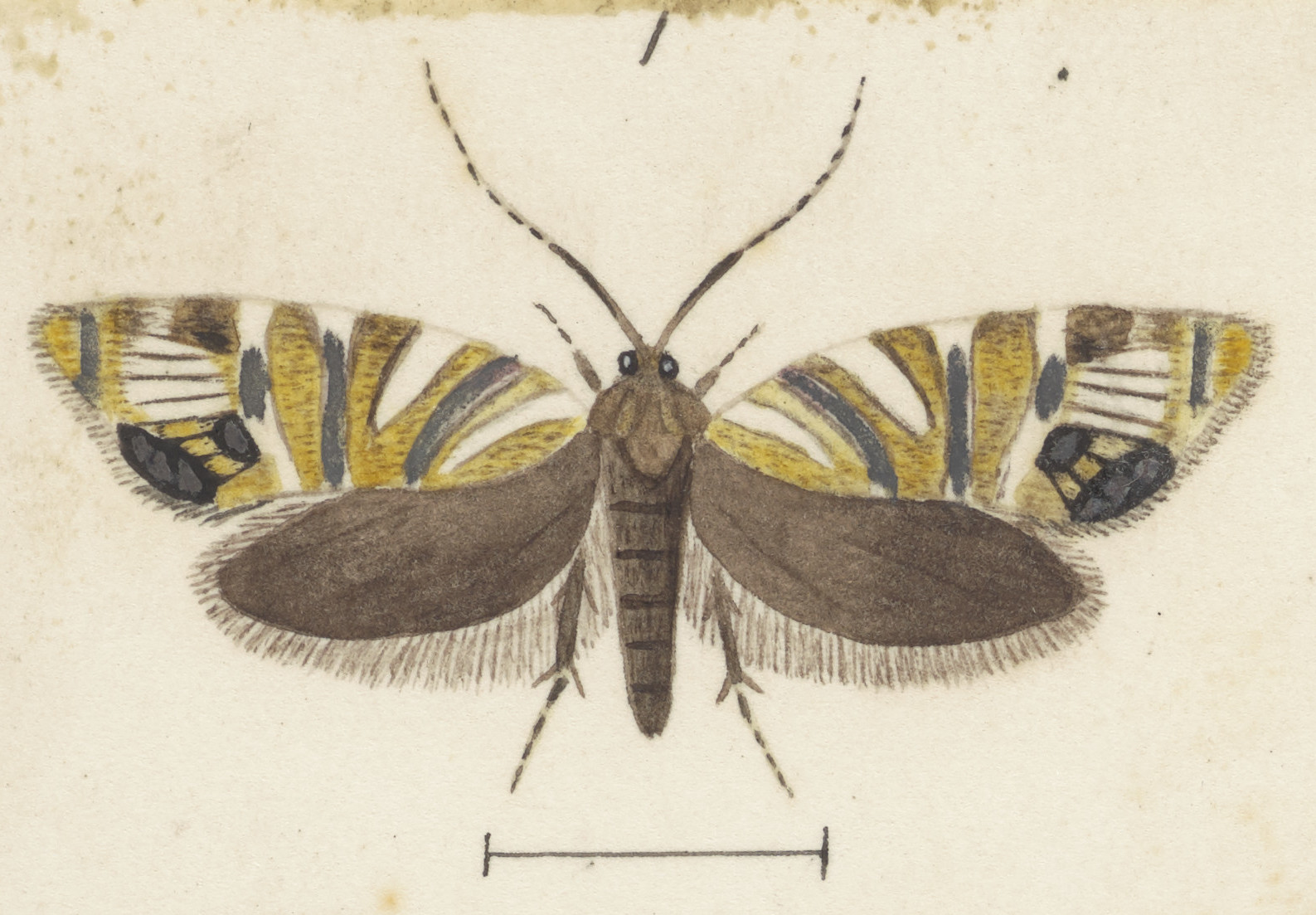
- Protosynaema eratopis

Scientific classification
- Domain: Eukaryota
- Kingdom: Animalia
- Phylum: Arthropoda
- Class: Insecta
- Order: Lepidoptera
- Family: Plutellidae
- Genus: Protosynaema; Meyrick, 1886

Species
- See text

= Protosynaema =

Genus of moths

Protosynaema is a genus of moths of the family Plutellidae.

== Species ==
Species in the genus Protosynaema include:

- Protosynaema eratopis Meyrick, 1886 (from New Zealand)
- Protosynaema hymenopis Meyrick, 1935 (from New Zealand)
- Protosynaema matutina Philpott, 1928(from New Zealand)
- Protosynaema quaestuosa Meyrick, 1924(from New Zealand)
- Protosynaema steropucha Meyrick, 1886 (from New Zealand)
