= Helenodes =

Scientific classification
- Domain: Eukaryota
- Kingdom: Animalia
- Phylum: Arthropoda
- Class: Insecta
- Order: Lepidoptera
- Family: Plutellidae
- Genus: Helenodes; Meyrick, 1913

Genus of moths

Helenodes is a genus of moths of the family Plutellidae.

== Species ==
- Helenodes murmurata Meyrick, 1913 (from India)
- Helenodes platyacma Meyrick, 1930 (from Mauritius)
