= Bahrlutia =

Scientific classification
- Domain: Eukaryota
- Kingdom: Animalia
- Phylum: Arthropoda
- Class: Insecta
- Order: Lepidoptera
- Family: Plutellidae
- Genus: Bahrlutia; Amsel, 1935

Genus of moths

Bahrlutia is a genus of moths in the family Plutellidae.

== Species ==
- Bahrlutia ghorella Amsel, 1935
- Bahrlutia schaeuffelei Amsel, 1959
