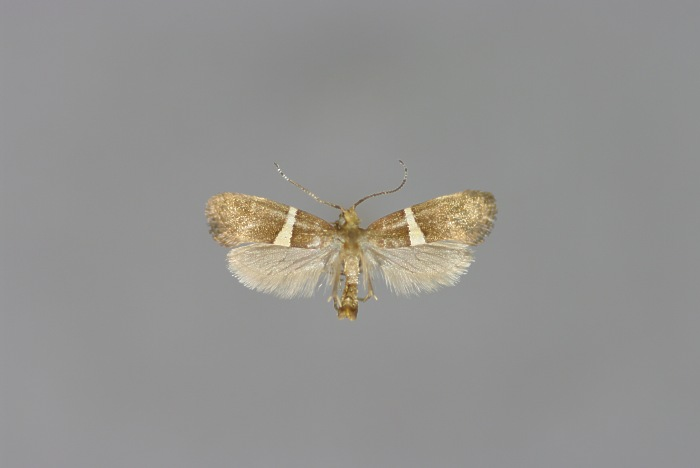
- Eidophasia messingiella

Scientific classification
- Domain: Eukaryota
- Kingdom: Animalia
- Phylum: Arthropoda
- Class: Insecta
- Order: Lepidoptera
- Family: Plutellidae
- Genus: Eidophasia; Stephens, 1842

Species
- See text

Synonyms
- Parasemia Stephens, 1841; Spania Guenée, 1845; Eudophasia Herrich-Schaffer, 1853; Hufnagelia Reutti, 1853

= Eidophasia =

Genus of moths

Eidophasia is a genus of moths in the family Plutellidae.

== Species ==
- Eidophasia albidorsella (Walsingham, 1881)
- Eidophasia albifasciata Issiki, 1931
- Eidophasia assmanni Huemer & Sohn, 2020
- Eidophasia dammersi (Busck, 1934)
- Eidophasia hufnagelii (Zeller, 1839)
- Eidophasia infuscata Staudinger, 1870
- Eidophasia insulella Walsingham, 1900
- Eidophasia messingiella (Fischer von Röslerstamm, 1840)
- Eidophasia peristigma Diakonoff, 1955
- Eidophasia syenitella Herrich-Schäffer, 1854
- Eidophasia tauricella Staudinger, 1880
- Eidophasia vanella (Walsingham, 1881)
- Eidophasia zukowskyi Amsel, 1939
