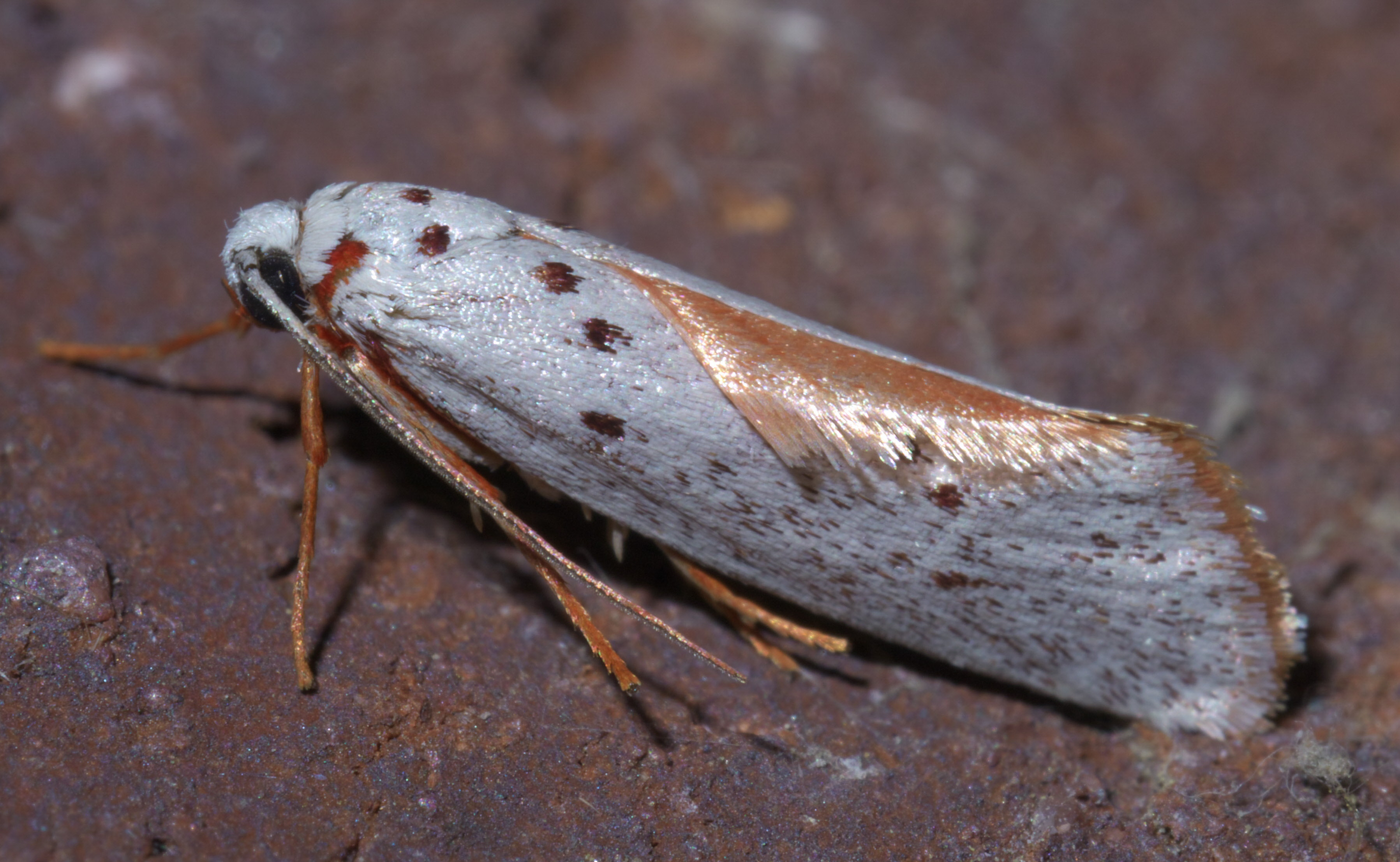
- Lactura subfervens

Scientific classification
- Kingdom: Animalia
- Phylum: Arthropoda
- Class: Insecta
- Order: Lepidoptera
- Family: Lacturidae
- Genus: Lactura; Walker, 1854

Synonyms
- List: Eustixis Hübner, [1827-1831]; Dianasa Walker, 1854; Mieza Walker, 1854; Sarbena Walker, [1865] (preocc. Sarbena Walker, 1862); Themiscyra Walker, [1865]; Cyptasia Walker, 1866; Buxeta Walker, 1866 (replacement name for Sarbena); Enaemia Zeller, 1872; Pseudotalara Druce, 1885; Pseudocaprima Walsingham, 1900; Epidictica Turner, 1903; Hedycharis Turner, 1903; Eriopyrrha Meyrick, 1913

= Lactura =

Genus of moths

Lactura is a genus of moths in the family Lacturidae.

== Selected species ==
- Lactura aglaodora (Turner, 1942)
- Lactura calliphylla (Turner, 1903)
- Lactura caminaea (Meyrick, 1887)
- Lactura cristata (Butler, 1886)
- Lactura dives (Walker, 1854)
- Lactura erythocera (R. Felder & Rogenhofer, 1875)
- Lactura erythractis (Meyrick, 1887)
- Lactura haplochroa (Turner, 1932)
- Lactura laetifera (Walker, 1865)
- Lactura leucophthalma (Meyrick, 1907)
- Lactura mactata (R. Felder & Rogenhofer, 1875)
- Lactura panopsia (Turner, 1926)
- Lactura parallela (Meyrick, 1889)
- Lactura phoenobapta (Turner, 1903)
- Lactura pilcheri (T.P. Lucas, 1891)
- Lactura pteropoecila (Turner, 1913)
- Lactura pyrilampis (Meyrick, 1886)
- Lactura pyronympha Meyrick, 1923
- Lactura quadrifrenis Meyrick, 1936 (from Para, Brazil)
- Lactura rhodomochla (Turner, 1942)
- Lactura rubritexta (Meyrick, 1913)
- Lactura sapotearum (Swainson, 1851)
- Lactura thiospila (Turner, 1903)
