= Zarcinia =

Scientific classification
- Domain: Eukaryota
- Kingdom: Animalia
- Phylum: Arthropoda
- Class: Insecta
- Order: Lepidoptera
- Family: Plutellidae
- Genus: Zarcinia; Chrétien, 1915

Genus of moths

Zarcinia is a genus of insects in the family Plutellidae.

== Species ==
- Zarcinia melanozestas Meyrick, 1935
- Zarcinia nigrosignatella Chrétien, 1915
- Zarcinia sacra Meyrick, 1925
- Zarcinia teleogramma (Meyrick, 1923)
- Zarcinia thiospila Turner, 1903
- Zarcinia triexoda (Meyrick, 1923)
- Zarcinia vulnerosa (Diakonoff, 1955)
