= Anticrates paraxantha =

Scientific classification
- Kingdom: Animalia
- Phylum: Arthropoda
- Class: Insecta
- Order: Lepidoptera
- Family: Lacturidae
- Genus: Anticrates
- Species: A. paraxantha

Binomial name
- Anticrates paraxantha (Meyrick, 1907)

Species of moth

Anticrates paraxantha is a moth of the Lacturidae family. It is known from Australia, including Queensland.
