= Toiana =

Scientific classification
- Kingdom: Animalia
- Phylum: Arthropoda
- Clade: Pancrustacea
- Class: Insecta
- Order: Lepidoptera
- Family: Lacturidae
- Genus: Toiana; Walker, 1866

Species
- See text

Genus of moths

Toiana is a monotypic genus of moths of the family Lacturidae. The type and only species is Toiana venosella - Walker, 1866.
