= Argyresthia curvella =

Apple blossom tineid

Scientific classification
- Kingdom: Animalia
- Phylum: Arthropoda
- Clade: Pancrustacea
- Class: Insecta
- Order: Lepidoptera
- Family: Argyresthiidae
- Genus: Argyresthia
- Species: A. curvella

Binomial name
- Argyresthia curvella (Linnaeus, 1761)

Synonyms
- See text

Species of moth

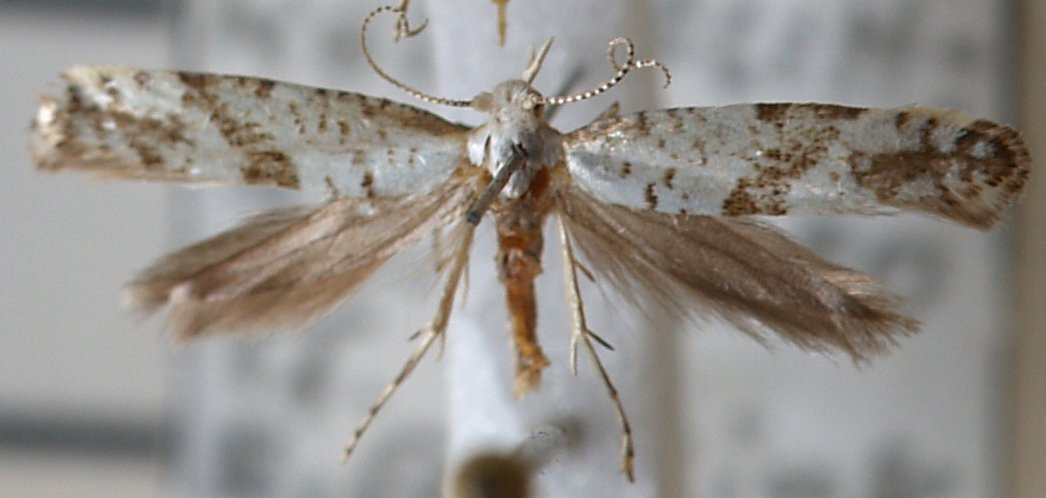
Faded adult specimen

Argyresthia curvella is a species of ermine moth (family Yponomeutidae). It belongs to subfamily Argyresthiinae, which is sometimes elevated to full family rank in the superfamily Yponomeutoidea. It is commonly called apple blossom tineid, reflecting the fact that it was originally believed to be a tineid moth (family Tinieidae).

This small moth is widespread in northwestern Eurasia. It is absent from Iberia and probably the entire Balkans, and generally ranges southwards only to the northern Mediterranean region; a possibly isolated population occurs in the Caucasus region. Where it occurs, it is usually not rare and may be abundant. The nocturnal adults are attracted to light sources; they are on the wing around June/July or somewhat later, depending on the location.

The wingspan of adults is 10–12 mm. As usual for Yponomeutidae, the forewings have a bold black-and-white pattern, which fades easily in museum specimens though. The pattern consists of a thick oblique black line running from the center of the forewings' dorsal margin to somewhat nearer the apex on the costal margin. From the apex, a thinner and often somewhat irregular black band extends to meet the first one. The remaining areas of the forewings are generously sprinkled with small black blotches. The hindwings are pale greyish, as is the body.

The caterpillars feed on Malus (apple) trees, where they eat the blossoms; it has also been suspected that they eat rotting apple wood at least occasionally. They may become a pest in apple orchards, if they occur in abundance.

== Synonyms ==
Invalid scientific names (junior synonyms and others) of the apple blossom tineid are:

- Argyresthia cornella (auct. non Fabricius, 1775: misidentification)
- Phalaena curvella Linnaeus, 1761
- Tinea arcella Fabricius, 1776
- Tinea cornella (auct. non Fabricius, 1775: misidentification)

The species has been confused with the somewhat similar and fairly closely related hawthorn moth (Scythropia crataegella) – the actual species described as Tinea cornella by J.C. Fabricius in 1775 – even in recent times.
