= Lactura pyrilampis =

Scientific classification
- Kingdom: Animalia
- Phylum: Arthropoda
- Class: Insecta
- Order: Lepidoptera
- Family: Lacturidae
- Genus: Lactura
- Species: L. pyrilampis

Binomial name
- Lactura pyrilampis (Meyrick, 1886)

Synonyms
- Enaemia pyrilampis Meyrick, 1886; Darantoides plagiata Hulstaert, 1924

Species of moth

Lactura pyrilampis is a moth of the family Lacturidae. It was described by Edward Meyrick in 1886. It is found on New Guinea and Papua New Guinea.
