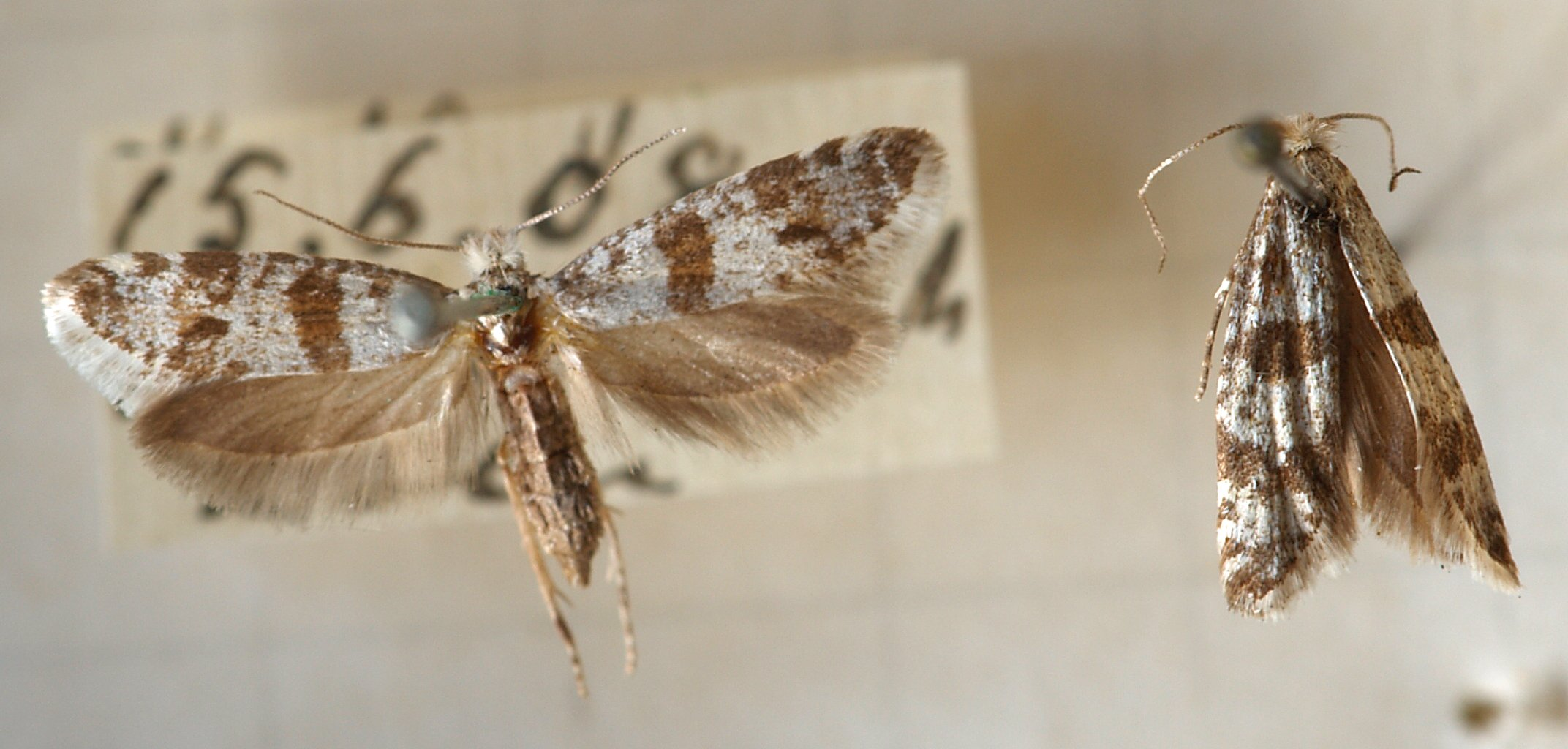
- Adult specimen

Scientific classification
- Kingdom: Animalia
- Phylum: Arthropoda
- Clade: Pancrustacea
- Class: Insecta
- Order: Lepidoptera
- Superfamily: Yponomeutoidea
- Family: Scythropiidae; Friese, 1966
- Genus: Scythropia; Hübner, 1825
- Species: S. crataegella

Binomial name
- Scythropia crataegella (Linnaeus, 1767)

Synonyms
- Phalaena (Tinea) crataegella Linnaeus, 1767; Argyresthia cornella (Fabricius, 1775); Scythropia crataegella f. obscura Weber, 1945; Tinea cornella Fabricius, 1775; Tinea sparsella Denis & Schiffermüller, 1775

= Scythropia crataegella =

Species of moth

Scythropia crataegella, the hawthorn moth, is a species of moth in the monotypic genus Scythropia. It is found in western Eurasia.

== Taxonomy ==
Described as Phalaena crataegella by Linnaeus in 1767, it was made the type species of Scythropia by Jacob Hübner in the 1820s. The genus is now placed in the monotypic family Scythropiidae., but was previously placed in subfamily Scythropiinae either in Plutellidae or Yponomeutidae.

Initially (in 1796), Hübner had misidentified the grass moth Eudonia lacustrata – much larger and only distantly related, but somewhat similar in color and pattern – as Linnaeus' Phalaena crataegella. Similarly, a junior synonym of this species, Tinea cornella, has frequently been misapplied – and sometimes still is even today – to the fairly closely related apple blossom tineid.

== Description and ecology ==
Scythropia crataegella is a small moth is widespread almost all over Europe; it is absent from Great Britain north of The Lake District, and has also not been recorded yet on Iceland and Ireland (where it is probably genuinely absent), in Portugal (where it may be absent), and in Slovenia (where it probably occurs but has not been found yet, as its range includes the surrounding countries). It is quite common throughout its range. The nocturnal adults are attracted to light sources; on Great Britain they are only commonly seen in July, but elsewhere they may be found from late May to September and have two generations per year.

The wingspan of adults is 11–15 mm. As usual for the Yponomeutidae, the forewings have a bold black-and-white pattern: two thick but irregular black bands divide the white forewings into roughly equal inner, middle and outer parts, and the white between the bands has numerous small black spots. The hindwings are dusky greyish-brown and unadorned. The body is whitish. The caterpillar larvae feed in large groups from the safety of a silken web they produce together; young larvae are leaf miners. The mainstay food is leaves of Crataegus (hawthorn), hence the species' name. But they have also been recorded from other Amygdaloideae, e.g. blackthorn (Prunus spinosa) and other Prunus species, Cotoneaster, as well as Malus sylvestris and Pyrus (pear).
