= Anticrates phaedima =

Scientific classification
- Kingdom: Animalia
- Phylum: Arthropoda
- Class: Insecta
- Order: Lepidoptera
- Family: Lacturidae
- Genus: Anticrates
- Species: A. phaedima

Binomial name
- Anticrates phaedima Turner, 1913

Species of moth

Anticrates phaedima is a moth of the Lacturidae family. It is known from Australia, including Queensland.

The wingspan is about 18 mm. Adults have whitish-yellow forewings with dark fuscous markings. The hindwings are red, but become paler towards the base.
