= Lactura pyronympha =

Scientific classification
- Kingdom: Animalia
- Phylum: Arthropoda
- Class: Insecta
- Order: Lepidoptera
- Family: Lacturidae
- Genus: Lactura
- Species: L. pyronympha

Binomial name
- Lactura pyronympha Meyrick, 1923

Synonyms
- Darantoides lineolata Hulstaert, 1924

Species of moth

Lactura pyronympha is a moth of the family Lacturidae. It was described by Edward Meyrick in 1923. It is found in Papua New Guinea, where it is a common and widely distributed species.
