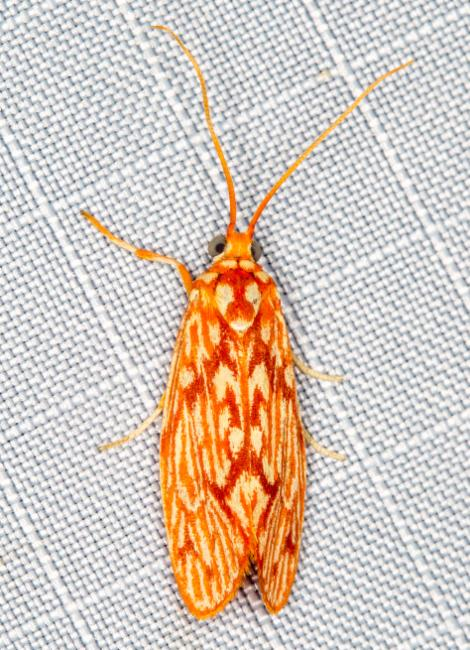

Scientific classification
- Kingdom: Animalia
- Phylum: Arthropoda
- Class: Insecta
- Order: Lepidoptera
- Family: Lacturidae
- Genus: Lactura
- Species: L. erythractis

Binomial name
- Lactura erythractis (Meyrick, 1887)

Synonyms
- Enaemia erythractis Meyrick, 1887; Eustixis erythractis

= Lactura erythractis =

Species of moth

Lactura erythractis is a moth of the Lacturidae family. It is known from Australia, where it has been recorded from Queensland and the Northern Territory.

The wingspan is 26–32 mm. The forewings are pale yellow with red lines. There is a narrow line along the costa and another along the inner margin, the basal portion is broad and the median portion sometimes obsolete. There is a short streak along the basal part of vein 12 and a streak along vein 11 to the costa. The cell is broadly outlined, incompletely so along the submedian, crossed towards the base by an oblique line which is prolonged to dorsum. Beyond this, it is divided by a median line, each division containing a short longitudinal streak. There is a strong line from the end of the cell to the dorsum. Veins 2 to 10 are outlined. The hindwings are reddish.
