= Trychnomera =

Scientific classification
- Domain: Eukaryota
- Kingdom: Animalia
- Phylum: Arthropoda
- Class: Insecta
- Order: Lepidoptera
- Family: Yponomeutidae
- Subfamily: Yponomeutinae
- Genus: Trychnomera; Turner, 1913

Species
- Trychnomera anthemis Turner, 1913

Genus of moths

Trychnomera is a monotypic genus of moths in the Lactura group of the superfamily Zygaenoidea. It was first described in 1913 by Alfred Jefferis Turner, along with its sole species Trychnomera anthemis.
