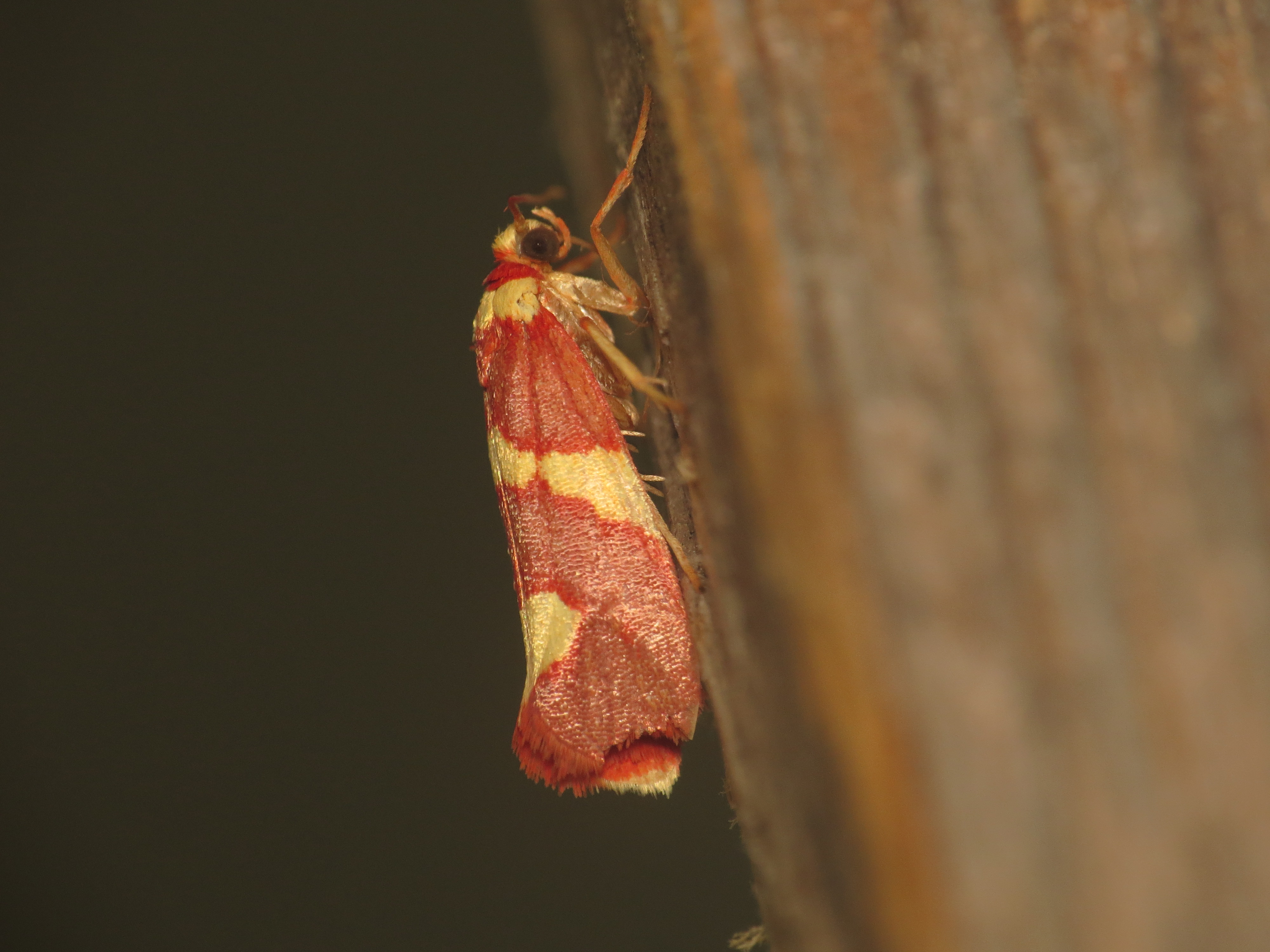

Scientific classification
- Kingdom: Animalia
- Phylum: Arthropoda
- Class: Insecta
- Order: Lepidoptera
- Family: Lacturidae
- Genus: Anticrates
- Species: A. metreta

Binomial name
- Anticrates metreta (Turner, 1903)

Synonyms
- Epopsia metreta Turner, 1903

= Anticrates metreta =

Species of moth

Anticrates metreta is a moth of the Lacturidae family. It is known from Queensland, Australia. Anticrates metreta's wingspan is around 2cms.
