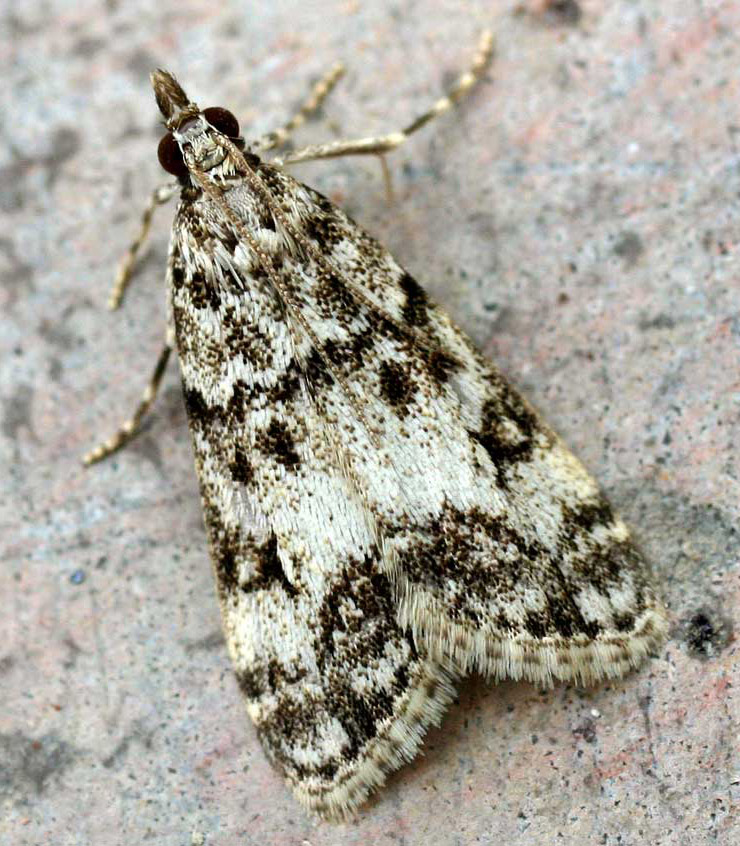

Scientific classification
- Kingdom: Animalia
- Phylum: Arthropoda
- Class: Insecta
- Order: Lepidoptera
- Family: Crambidae
- Genus: Eudonia
- Species: E. lacustrata

Binomial name
- Eudonia lacustrata (Panzer, 1804)

Synonyms
- List: Phalaena lacustrata Panzer, 1804; Phalaena crataegella sensu Hübner, 1796: misidentified; Dipleurina lacustrata f. heimi Leraut, 1984; Dipleurina lacustrata f. unita Leraut, 1984; Scoparia crataegella; Eudorea pusilla Westwood in Humphreys & Westwood, 1841; Eudonia lacustrata persica Leraut, 1984

= Eudonia lacustrata =

Species of moth

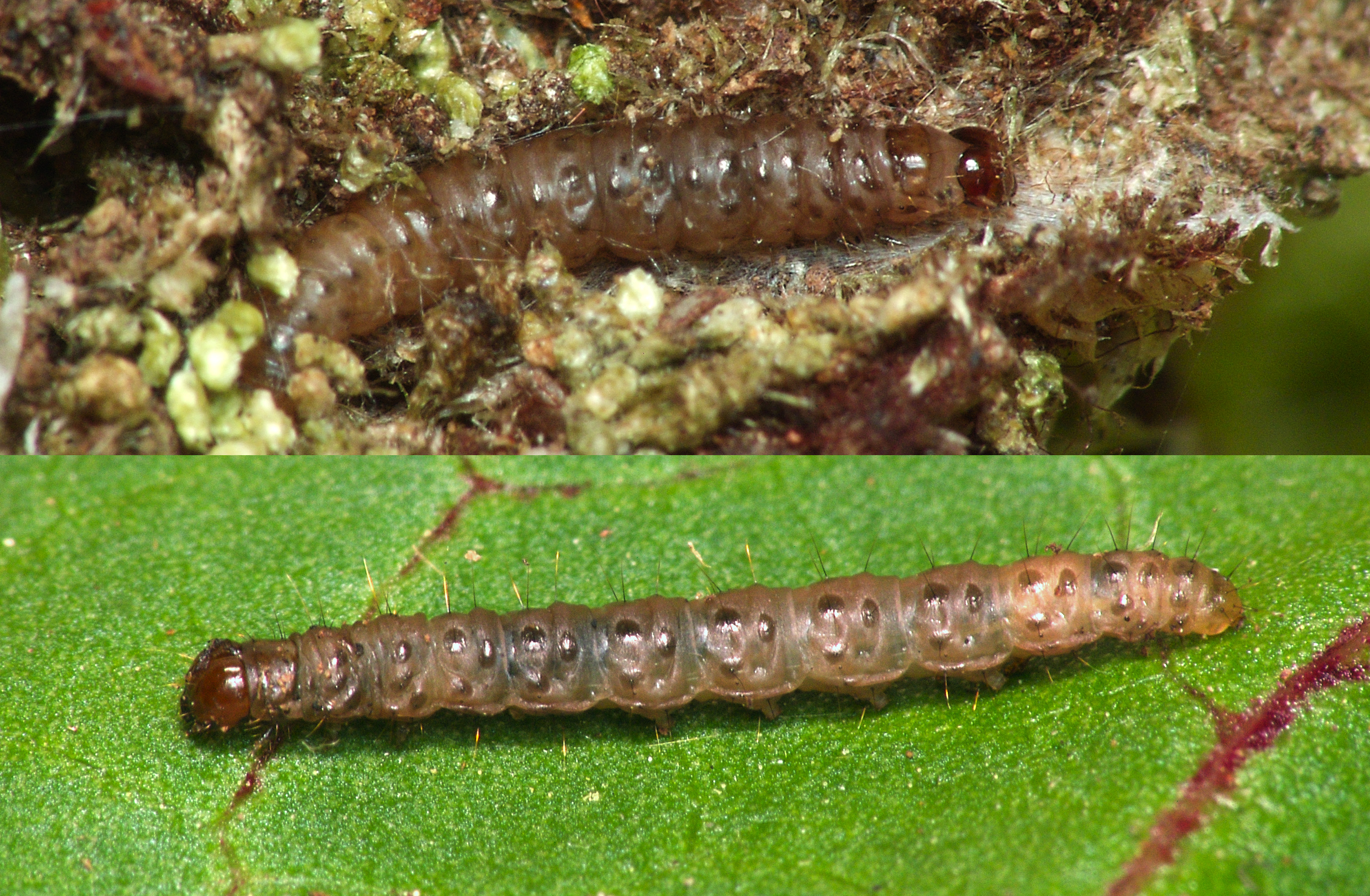
Larva

Eudonia lacustrata is a species of moth of the family Crambidae described by Georg Wolfgang Franz Panzer in 1804. It is found in Europe, north-west Africa, Asia from Turkey, Iran and Syria to Siberia and the western part of China (Hunan). The subspecies E. lacustrata persica is found in Iran and Armenia.

The wingspan is 16–18 mm (0.63–0.71 in). Forewings whitish, sometimes mixed with light ochreous-yellowish, sprinkled with black; base black-marked; lines whitish, blackish-edged, first irregular, second rather sinuate; orbicular and claviform dot-like, black; a black X-shaped discal mark; terminal area grey mixed with black, subterminal line white, interrupted in middle. Hindwings whitish-grey, darker terminally. Larva yellowish-green; spots brownish-green; head and plate of 2 black-brown: on mosses; 3, 4.

The moth flies from May to August depending on the location. The larvae feed on various mosses.
