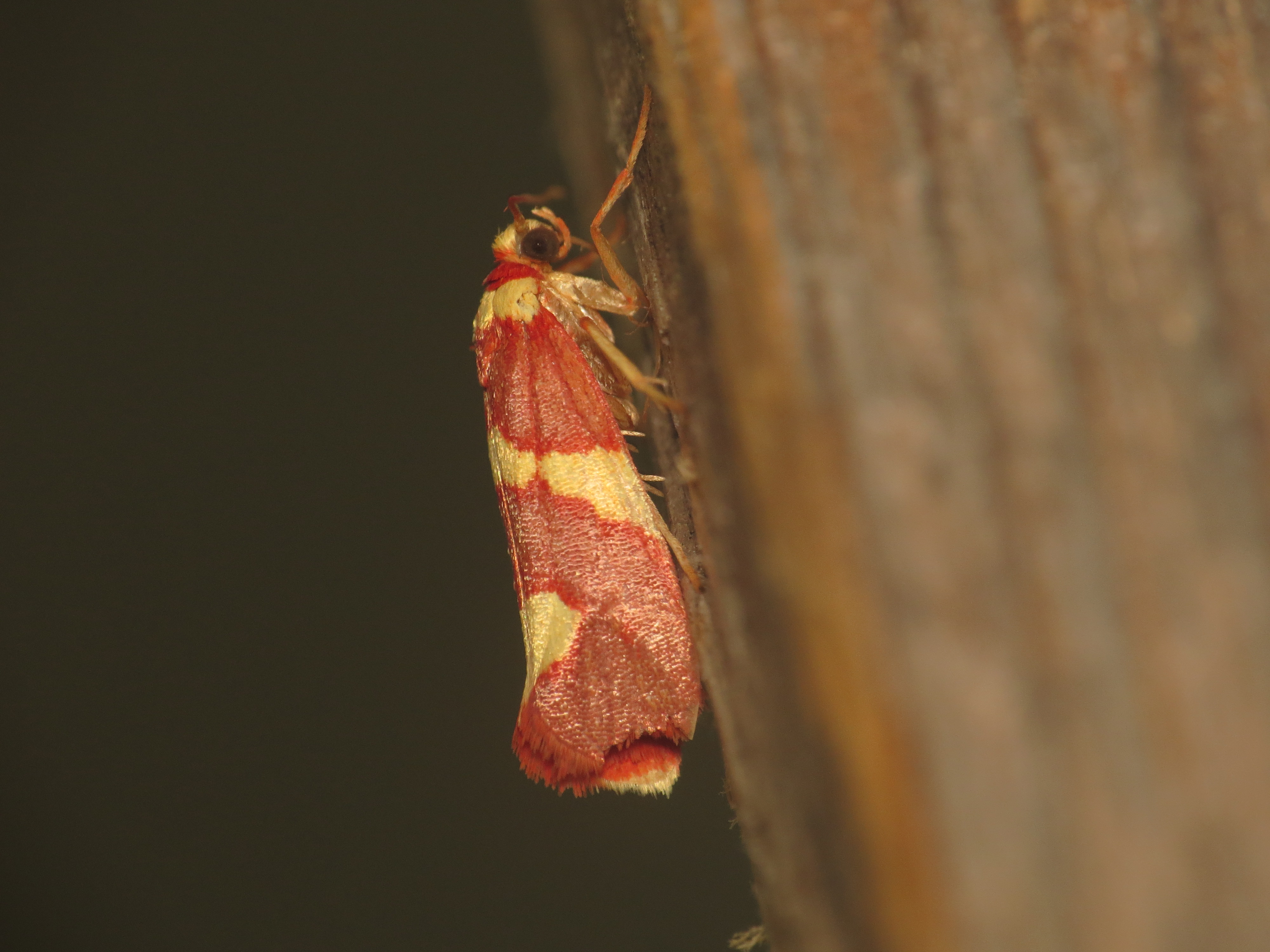
- Anticrates metreta

Scientific classification
- Kingdom: Animalia
- Phylum: Arthropoda
- Class: Insecta
- Order: Lepidoptera
- Family: Lacturidae
- Genus: Anticrates; Meyrick, 1905

Synonyms
- Epopsia Turner, 1903; Pyrozela Meyrick, 1906

= Anticrates =

Genus of moths

Anticrates is a genus of moths of the Lacturidae family.

== Selected species ==
- Anticrates crocophaea Meyrick, 1921
- Anticrates electropis Meyrick, 1921
- Anticrates metreta (Turner, 1903)
- Anticrates paraxantha (Meyrick, 1907)
- Anticrates phaedima Turner, 1913
- Anticrates zapyra Meyrick, 1907
