= Rhigognostis =

Scientific classification
- Kingdom: Animalia
- Phylum: Arthropoda
- Clade: Pancrustacea
- Class: Insecta
- Order: Lepidoptera
- Family: Plutellidae
- Genus: Rhigognostis; Zeller, 1857

Genus of butterflies

Rhigognostis is a genus of butterfly belonging to the family Plutellidae.

The genus was first described by Zeller in 1857.

The species of this genus are found in Europe and Northern America.

Species:

- Rhigognostis kuusamoensis Kyrki, 1989
