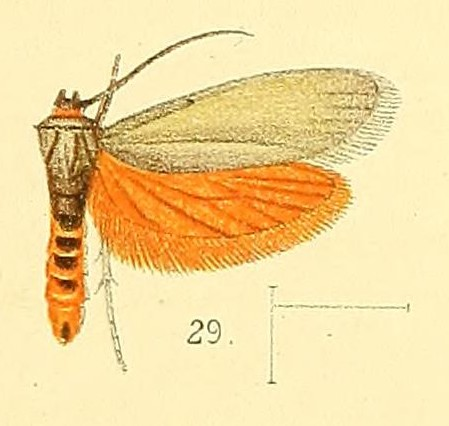
- Gymnogramma hutchinsoni

Scientific classification
- Kingdom: Animalia
- Phylum: Arthropoda
- Clade: Pancrustacea
- Class: Insecta
- Order: Lepidoptera
- Superfamily: Zygaenoidea
- Family: Lacturidae; Heppner, 1995

Type genus
- Lactura Walker, 1854

= Lacturidae =

Family of moths

The Lacturidae also called Tropical Burnet Moths are a pantropical family of moths in the superfamily Zygaenoidea. Brightly coloured tropical moths, the Lacturidae have been previously placed in the Plutellidae, Yponomeutidae, and Hyponomeutidae.

== Genera ==
- Aictis Turner, 1926
- Anticrates Meyrick, 1905
- Callithrinca Meyrick, 1913
- Epopsia Meyrick, 1913
- Gymnogramma Meyrick, 1905
- Lactura Walker, 1854
- Nosymna Walker, 1864
- Thyridectis Meyrick, 1886
- Toiana Walker, 1886
- Trychnomera Turner, 1913
