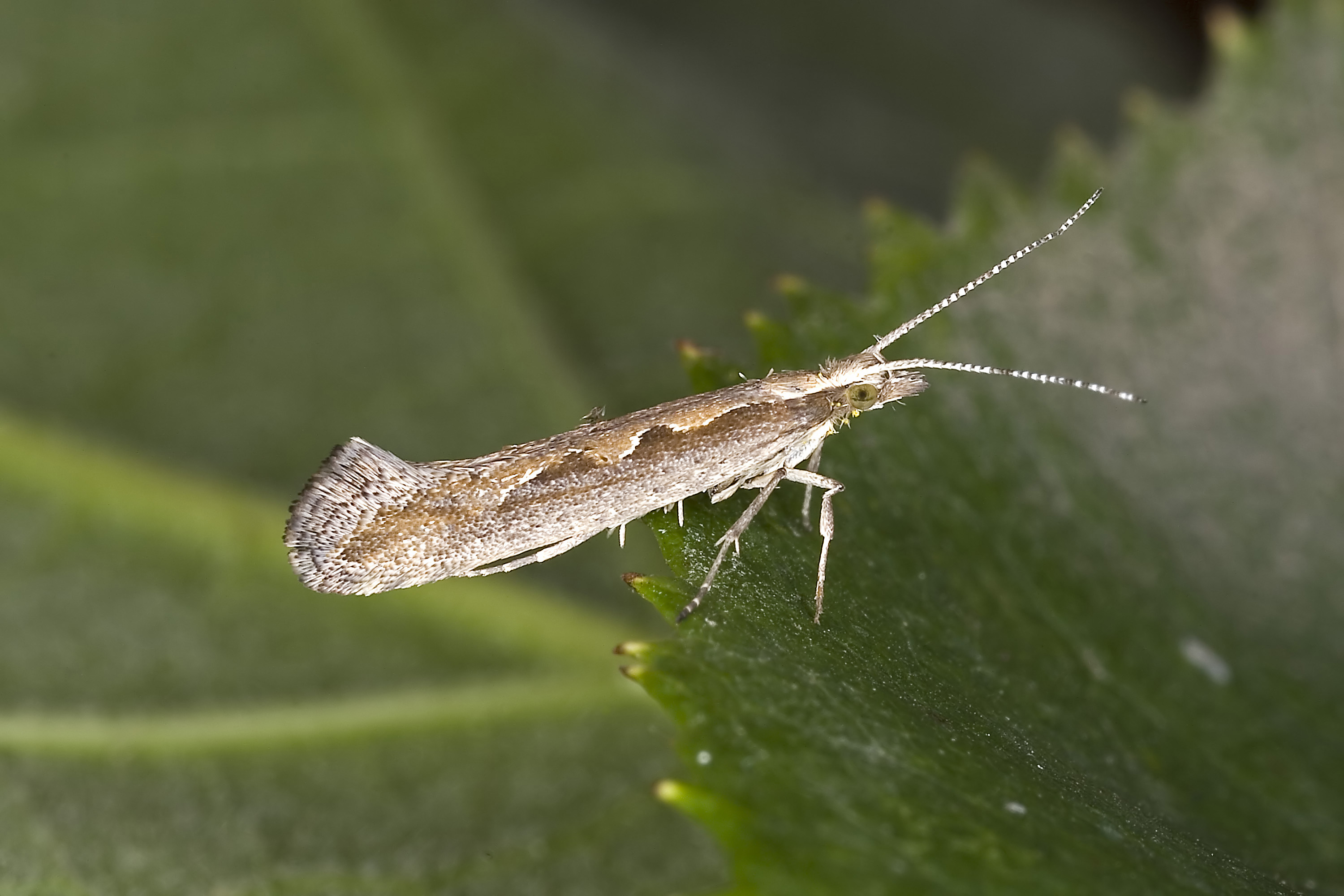
- Diamondback moth (Plutella xylostella)

Scientific classification
- Kingdom: Animalia
- Phylum: Arthropoda
- Class: Insecta
- Order: Lepidoptera
- Superfamily: Yponomeutoidea
- Family: Plutellidae; Guenée, 1845

Genera
- See text

Diversity
- About 200 species

Synonyms
- Plutellinae Guenée, 1845; Plutellini Guenée, 1845

= Plutellidae =

Family of moths

The Plutellidae are a family of moths commonly known as the diamondback moths, named after the diamondback moth (Plutella xylostella) of European origin. It was once considered to have three subfamilies: Plutellinae, Praydinae, and Scythropiinae. Praydinae was later elevated to its own family, Praydidae, while Scythropiinae has variously been moved to Yponomeutidae or also elevated to its own family.

== Characteristics ==
Moths in this family are small to medium in size with wingspans ranging from 7 to 55 mm (0.3 to 2.2 in). The head usually bears smooth scales and the antennae are often thickened in the middle. The wings are elongated and the hindwings often bear long fringes. The forewings often appear to be sickle-shaped because of the arrangement of the fringes. The colouring is generally drab, with various banding and marking. The adults are mostly nocturnal or crepuscular. The larvae feed on the surfaces of leaves which they skeletonise. The host plants vary, but many are in the family Brassicaceae. Some species are economic pests, especially Plutella xylostella.

== Genera ==
Below are the genera of the family Plutellidae:

- Angoonopteryx Moriuti, 1983
- Anthonympha Moriuti, 1971
- Araeolepia Walsingham, 1881
- Arrhetopista Meyrick, 1936
- Automachaeris Meyrick, 1907
- Baerenschenkia Mey, 2011
- Bahrlutia Amsel, 1935
- Cadmogenes Meyrick, 1923
- Calliathla Meyrick, 1931
- Charitoleuca Meyrick, 1938
- Charixena Meyrick, 1920
- Chrysorthenches Dugdale, 1996
- Circoxena Meyrick, 1916
- Conopotarsa Meyrick, 1913
- Deryaxenistis Mey, 2011
- Diastatica Meyrick, 1938
- Diathryptica Meyrick, 1907
- Dieda Diakonoff, 1955
- Dolichernis Meyrick, 1891
- Doxophyrtis Meyrick, 1914
- Eidophasia Stephens, 1842
- Embryonopsis Eaton, 1875
- Endozestis Meyrick, 1933
- Eudolichura Clarke, 1965
- Genostele Walsingham, 1900
- Gypsosaris Meyrick, 1909
- Helenodes Meyrick, 1913
- Hyperxena Meyrick, 1882
- Lepocnemis Meyrick, 1913
- Leuroperna Clarke, 1965
- Leuroptila Turner, 1923
- Lunakia Klimesch, 1941
- Melitonympha Meyrick, 1927
- Niphodidactis Meyrick, 1938
- Orthenches Meyrick, 1885
- Orthiostola Meyrick, 1927
- Paraxenistis Meyrick, 1919
- Phalangitis Meyrick, 1907
- Philaustera Meyrick, 1927
- Phylacodes Meyrick, 1905
- Pliniaca Busck, 1907
- Plutella Schrank, 1802
- Plutellites Kozlov, 1988
- Plutelloptera Baraniak, 2007
- Proditrix Dugdale, 1987
- Protosynaema Meyrick, 1885
- Psychromnestra Meyrick, 1924
- Rhigognostis Zeller, 1857
- Scaeophanes Meyrick, 1932
- Spyridarcha Meyrick, 1913
- Stachyotis Meyrick, 1905
- Subeidophasia Weber, 1938
- Tonza Walker, 1864
- Tritymba Lower, 1894
- Zarcinia Chretien, 1915

== Excluded genera and species ==
The fungus moth Erechthias niphochrysa was also once included here, as a distinct genus Acrocenotes.

The family Acrolepiidae (including the genera Acrolepia, Acrolepiopsis, and Digitivalva) is sometimes included in the Plutellidae.
