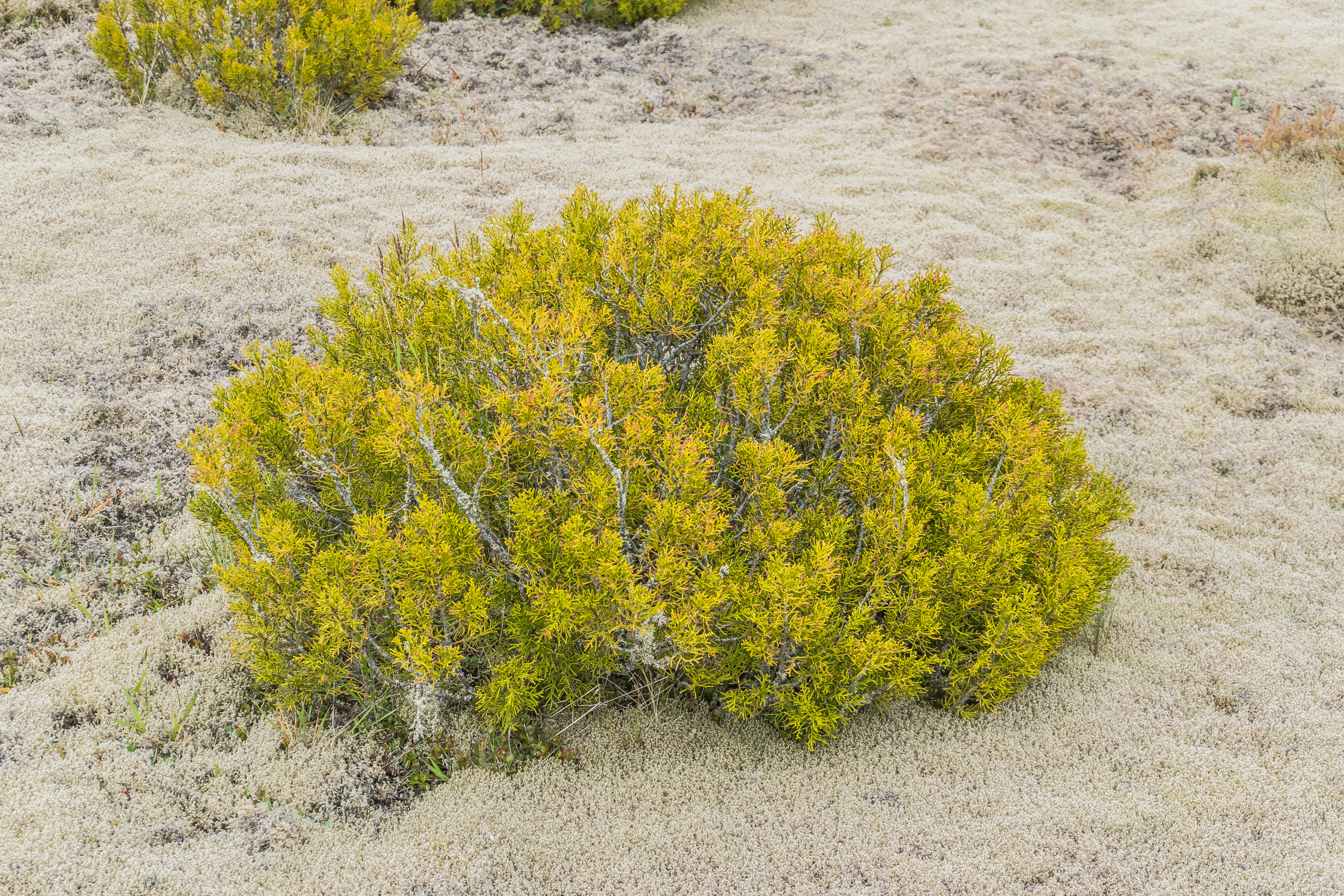

Conservation status
- Least Concern (IUCN 3.1)

- Not Threatened (NZ TCS)

Scientific classification
- Kingdom: Plantae
- Clade: Tracheophytes
- Clade: Gymnosperms
- Division: Pinophyta
- Class: Pinopsida
- Order: Araucariales
- Family: Podocarpaceae
- Genus: Halocarpus
- Species: H. bidwillii

Binomial name
- Halocarpus bidwillii (Hook.f. ex Kirk) Quinn

Synonyms
- Dacrydium bidwillii Hook.f. ex Kirk; Dacrydium bidwillii var. erecta Kirk; Dacrydium bidwillii var. reclinata Kirk

= Halocarpus bidwillii =

Species of conifer

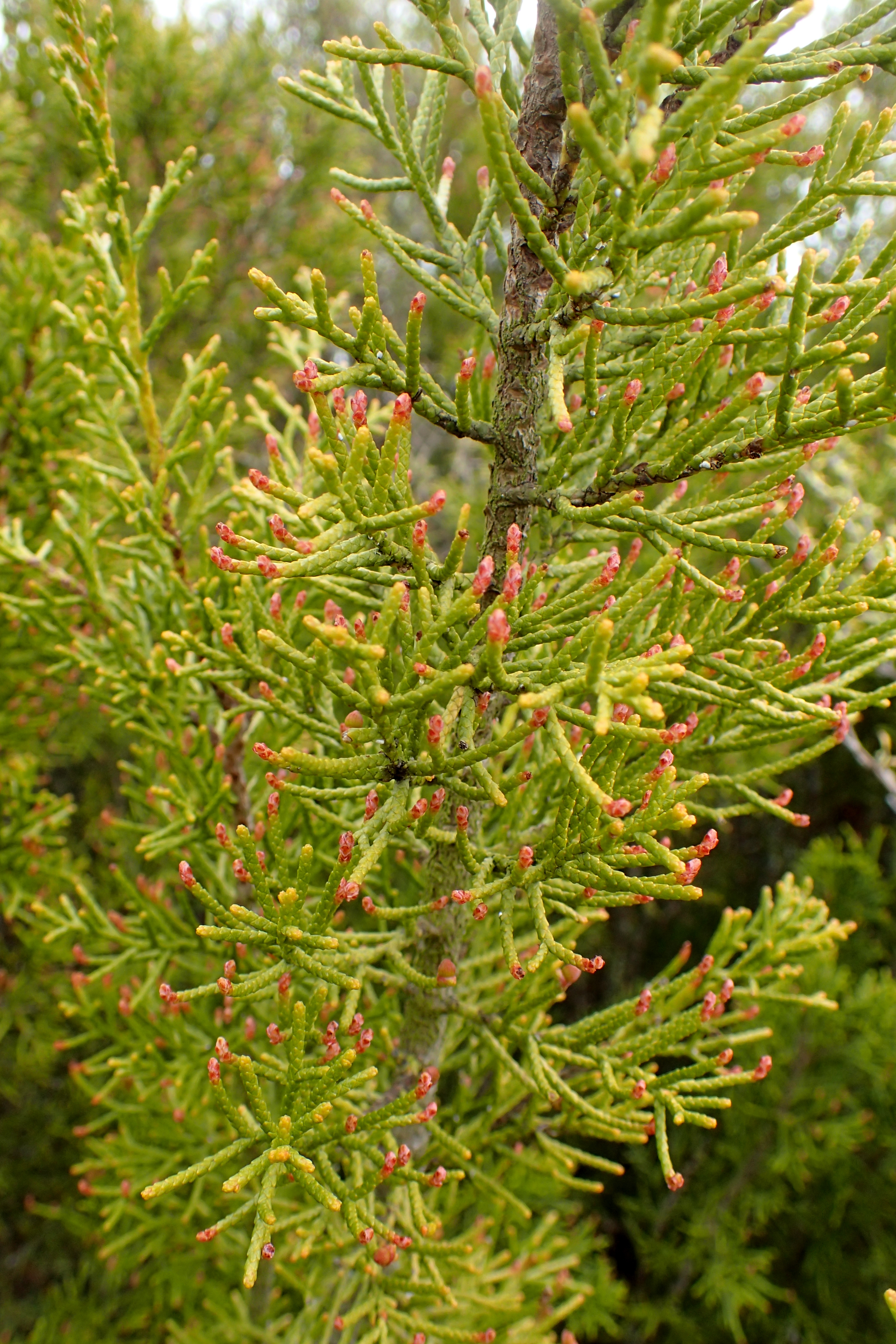
Halocarpus bidwillii in Wilderness Scientific Reserve NW from The Key, South Island, New Zealand

Halocarpus bidwillii, commonly known as the mountain pine or bog pine, is a species of dioecious conifer in the family Podocarpaceae. It is endemic to New Zealand and can be found throughout the North and South Islands.

It is a shrub favouring both bogs and dry stony ground, seldom growing to more than 3.5 m (11 ft) high. The leaves are scale-like on adult plants, 1–2 mm (0.039–0.079 in) long, arranged spirally on the shoots; young seedlings and occasional shoots on older plants have soft strap-like leaves 5–10 mm (0.20–0.39 in) and 1–1.5 mm (0.039–0.059 in) broad. The seed cones are highly modified, berry-like, with a white aril surrounding the single 2–3 mm (0.079–0.118 in) long seed.

== Description ==
H. bidwillii grows as a shrub. It grows up to 4.8 m (15.7 ft) tall and has a short trunk that Kirk noted "rarely exceeds" 1 foot in diameter, and more commonly has a thickness between 30–40 cm (12–16 in) at breast height. Its bark is red to brown and trunks have multiple branches, though will occasionally have just one. In some rare cases, as the horizontal branches grow, their roots will form a "bush" around the parent shrub. This creates a vast mini-forest that looks like a huge low tree or shrub. The parent tree may die, leaving its outliers intact which are thin and red.

Depending on the maturity of a mountain pine, the shrubs take on rather drastic differences in leaf appearance. In the juvenile state, leaves are linear, flat, and spreading, much like a pine tree, while in the mature state, its leathery leaves, 1–2 mm long, take on an overlapping scaled appearance, much like the scales of a fish. The leaves are green when fresh, but can become brown to red when they are dried out. During the flowering months of October to December, small male cones, 3–5 mm in length, are brown to red at the end of the pine's scale-like leaves. Stomata can be seen by the naked eye and seen as white spots. Pollen particles are solitary, terminal, ca. 3–5 mm long. Appendage is adnate to base of carpel, cortex, inverted, with a drooping ovule. The fruit of mountain pine consists of a dark brown, black-brown to purple-brown seed in a fleshy, waxy white cup. Seeds are 2–3 mm long, subglobose, compressed, with a white to yellow aril. The aril is V-shaped under the seed. Seeds are hairless, smooth, 3–4.5 mm long (including arils), and take on a dark brown or dark brown to dark purple brown appearance; seeds are also typically shiny, oval oblong, and compressed.

Bog pines are easily recognized when fruiting by the waxy white (very slightly yellowish) arils subtending the seed. Vegetatively compared with other species of Halocarpus, mountain pines have growth habits of smaller multibranched shrubs to small trees, weak keel-shaped leaves, and more slender, initially quadrangular branchlets. The seeds of the mountain pine are distinguished from H. biformis (with which it often confused with) by the ventral and dorsal surfaces which are usually significant longitudinally grooved (sometimes only on the ventral surface).

== Taxonomy ==
Halocarpus bidwillii was first described by the British botanist Thomas Kirk in 1887, in an article in the Transactions and Proceedings of the New Zealand Institute, (Note: This journal is now called the "Transactions and Proceedings of the Royal Society of New Zealand.") as Dacrydium bidwillii. He identified two variants that he differentiated mostly on the basis of branch and inflorescence (flower spike) shape. The alpha (α) or erecta variety had flat and ribbed leaves with slender branches, while the beta (β) or reclinata variety had distinct mid-rib leaves and stout branches. Harry Allan disputed the status of these varieties in his 1961 Flora of New Zealand (Vol 1), suggesting instead they were the result of hybridisation. It was not until 1982 when C.J. Quinn proposed an alternative taxonomy for the species based on ovule morphology and orientation, that the species obtained the current scientific name of Halocarpus bidwillii.

=== Etymology ===
The specific epithet bidwillii is in honor of John Carne Bidwill (1815–1853) who was an Australian botanist born in England and became the first director of the Royal Botanic Gardens, Sydney.

=== Phylogeny ===
Three separate studies using DNA sequencing, one in the year 2000, and two in 2002, have confirmed that the genus Halocarpus is monophyletic, as they all descend from a common ancestor, though the wider clade it is part of was found to be unresolved. A study in 2002 from the journal of Plant Systematics and Evolution found a relationship in which H. kirkii and H. biformis form a clade, to which H. bidwillii is sister. This was replicated in a previous study from 2000 in the Australian Journal of Botany.

Subsequent studies from 2011 and 2012 however, have found that H. bidwillii instead forms a clade with H. biformis, to which H. kirkii is sister. These studies, in the Journal of Botany and Smithsonian Contributions to Botany, used data from the GenBank as well as their own de novo sequencing. One study analysed MatK, trnL–trnF and ITS2 DNA, while the other used plastid and mitochondrial loci, 18S rDNA, 26S rDNA, and ITS2 DNA as well.

Cladogram from studies in early 2000s.

- - - monoao (Halocarpus kirkii)
    - yellow or pink pine (Halocarpus biformis)
  - mountain or bog pine (Halocarpus bidwillii)

Cladogram from studies in 2010s.

- - monoao (Halocarpus kirkii)
  - - yellow or pink pine (Halocarpus biformis)
    - mountain or bog pine (Halocarpus bidwillii)

== Distribution and habitat ==
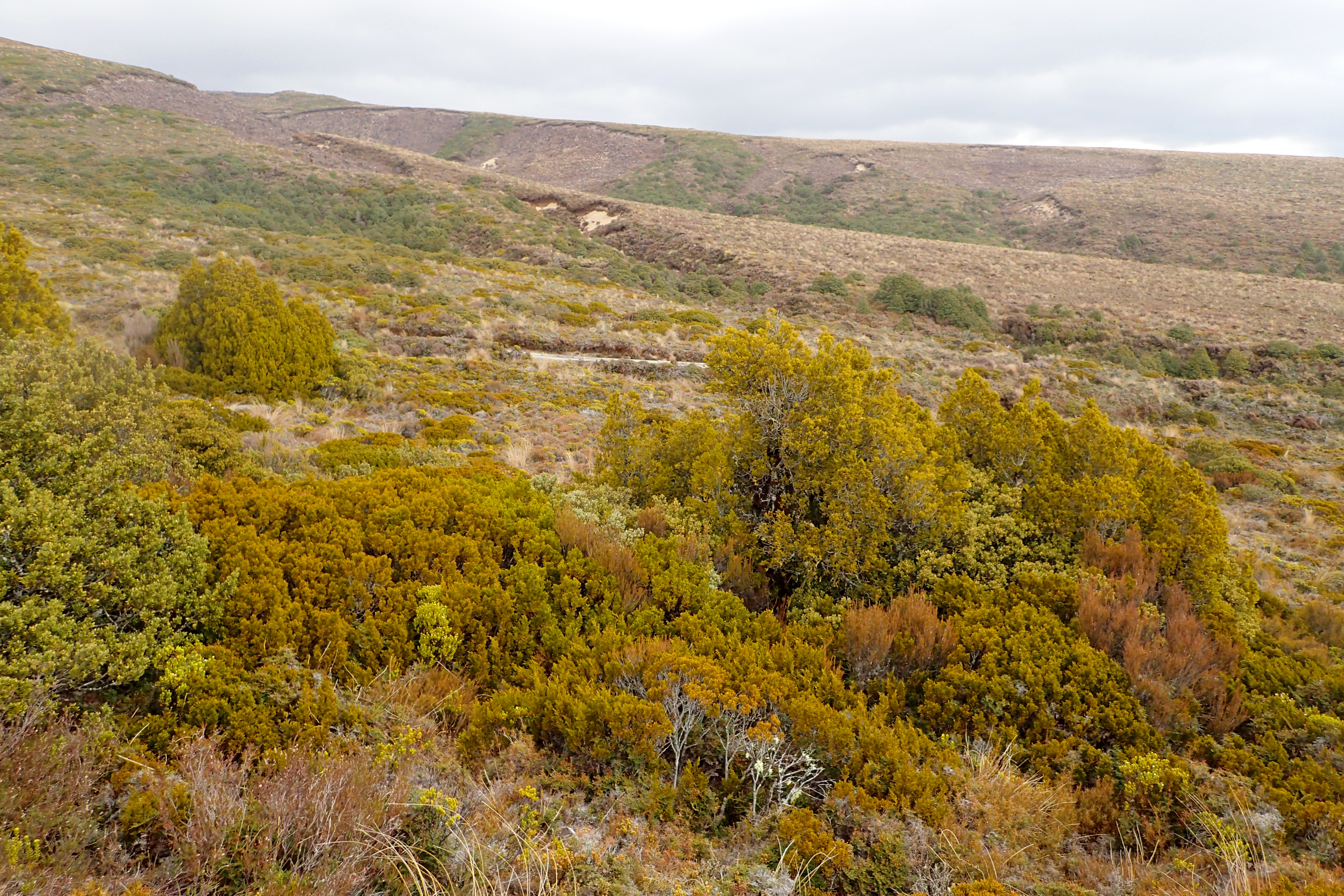
Halocarpus bidwillii in Tongariro National Park, on NW slopes of Mount Ruapehu.

Halocarpus bidwillii is endemic to New Zealand and grow from Coromandel to the extreme south; as the latitude increases, they are found at lower altitudes. In the North Island, it can be found in Taupō county near Rotoaira and in the central volcanic plateau and Kaingaroa plains. In the South Island, as the name implies, mountain pine are common in mountainous regions in Nelson, Canterbury, and Otago, with some plants found as high as 4,500 ft (1,400 m) above sea level in the Canterbury alps. Mountain pine can also be found on Stewart Island directly at sea level.

The mountain pine has a wide range of habitats, but mostly prefers montane to subalpine habitats from 39º latitude southward. Within its range, the annual average temperature is 8.5°C, the coldest month average minimum temperature is −0.8°C, and the annual average precipitation is 2,458 mm (2.458 m). In the North Island, mountain pine are found exclusively in montane to alpine habitats and usually between 600 and 1500 m elevation. However, mountain pine can also thrive in lowland conditions, and its presence on Stewart Island at sea level is an example of this. Mountain pine are also hardy plants growing in a wide range of ground conditions. Mountain pine can grow in both bog environments and in dry stony ground, with mountain pine growing extremely well in the Te Anau stony ground environment and just as effectively in wetland margins, frost flats, and riverbeds.

Mountain pine are one of the three most frost-resistant types of New Zealand conifers, and can typically resist frosts beyond −7 °C. Similarly resilient, mountain pine are often found in poor soils. True of many conifers, mountain pine actually prefer leached, low nutrient, and poorly drained soils, with many pollen diagrams showing that mountain pines thrive in infertile bogs. Although tolerant of frosts past −7 °C, mountain pines are typically found in environments with a mean annual temperature of 8.5 °C and an average minimum temperature of −0.8 °C. Mountain pine also live in environments that average 2,458 mm (2.458 m) of precipitation a year.

== Ecology ==
Thriving without true fruits, the mountain pine has few predators which are mostly herbivorous insects. Briefly, the 4 main categories of insects that prey on mountain pine are: beetles, sucking bugs, caterpillars, and mites. Weevils, a specific type of beetle, feed on all Podocarpaceae (mountain pine's taxonomic family), and larvae thrive in any kind of decaying wood, including mountain pine. More specific, scale insects, Eriococcus dacrydii, live on the stems and leaf scales of the Halocarpus species, and even more specific, (Dugdale, 1996) found a species of conifer associated moth that uses the mountain pine as its host plant, appropriately named Chrysorthenches halocarpi. The caterpillars of Chrysorthenches halocarpi feed on the mountain pine shoots and when too many are present, the mountain pine appears bronze and growth can be stunted. Finally, Tuckerella flabellifera, red mites with white scales from Tasmania, live on young mountain pine plants and presumably feed on the young leaves and wood.

== Phenology ==
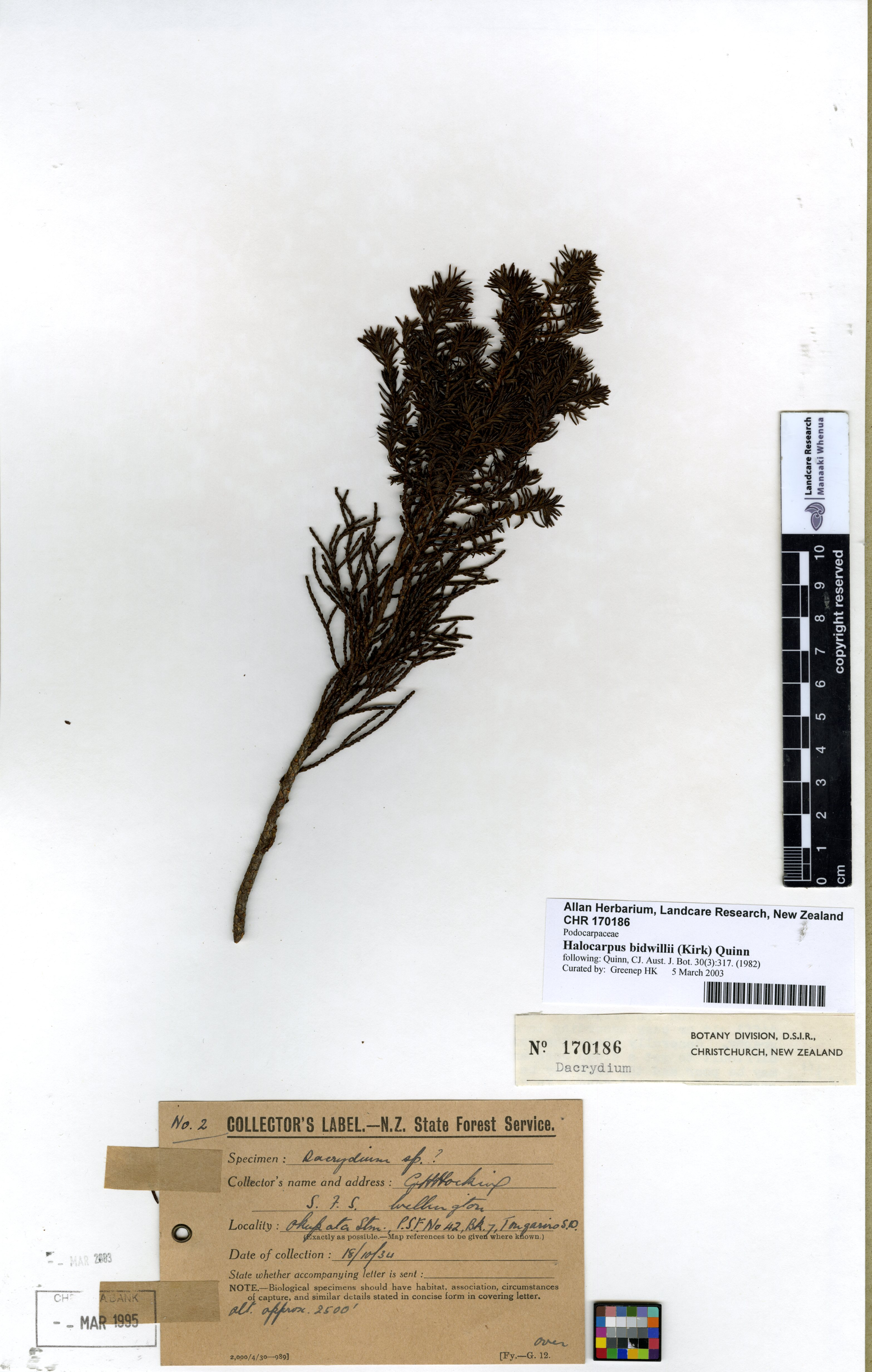
Specimen of Halocarpus bidwillii, or mountain pine, showing both mature scale like leaves at the bottom, and juvenile leaves at the top.

Like all conifers, the mountain pine life cycle is dependent on cones. Male and female flowers are found on separate trees – male cones 3-5mm long are at the tips of branches and female flowers grow solo or in pairs and form just below the tips of the branches. From the time of seeding, male conifers will take about 2–3 years to reach maturity. When they have matured, male cones appear during the flowering season which runs from October to December, but most often occurs during October and November. Depending on the exact location, cone development can vary with North Island mountain pine producing cones more toward the October end of the range. By the end of November, the once juvenile reddish cones take on more brown character and begin to shed pollen. Around this same time, ovules grow at the tips of the branches and once fertilized by the pollen they develop a white aril at the base. Seeds begin to develop in the following months up until the fruiting season, which occurs from February to June. By February, green fruits mature, but do not ripen until mid to early March. Once they begin to ripen, fruits ripen quickly and take on a purple to black colour similar to the shade of an eggplant.

The seeds themselves are only 3-4mm long and have regular grooves stretching the length of the seed. Mountain pine can often be confused with closely related H. biformis, but a key difference between these 2 species' seeds is that mountain pine seeds are typically smaller and squatter than those of H. biformis.

== Uses ==
When Kirk first described the mountain pine, he declared it to be of "little economic value" except perhaps for firewood. Perhaps he was unaware at the time, but Kirk should've specified that mountain pine could only be used for firewood without its bark. Mountain pine is one of the few New Zealand conifers that is able to resist fire, mostly because of its thick bark, but also because of its ability to recover through basal resprouting after a fire event. Other uses of the raw wood include timber production for use in buildings and railway sleepers.

Another potential use for mountain pine could be for decoration. Kirk commented on the "attractive character" of mountain pine, citing its symmetrical growth, and suggested that it could become an ornamental plant. Aside from decoration and perhaps firewood, no other uses of mountain pine or its products have been described to date.

=== Insecticidal activity ===
One trait of the mountain pine that is recently receiving academic attention, but has not yet been realized by the commercial sector is the use of mountain pine plant extract as an insecticide. Extracts of mountain pine foliage have shown the presence of organic compounds like diterpenes, phyllocladane and isophyllocladene and extracts of mountain pine leaves were shown to have been toxic to the codling moth, and partially toxic to the housefly. In these experiments milled leaf powders of several conifers (including the mountain pine) were incorporated into the diet of several insects and the mountain pine powder had over 75% mortality rate on the codling moths tested, and 55–75% mortality on the houseflies tested. Potentially toxic effects of mountain pine extract have also been studied in the germination of lettuce seeds. Foliage extracts from mountain pine significantly (p < 0.01) reduced germination when the extract came from both juvenile and adult pines, which did not differ from each other. Aside from germination, both juvenile and adult pines inhibited root hair growth. (Perry, 1995) hypothesized that these inhibitory effects of mountain pine might be due to allelopathic potential, since mountain pine often grow without any other vegetation below their shrubs. Further research is needed before mountain pine extract becomes of any commercial value.
