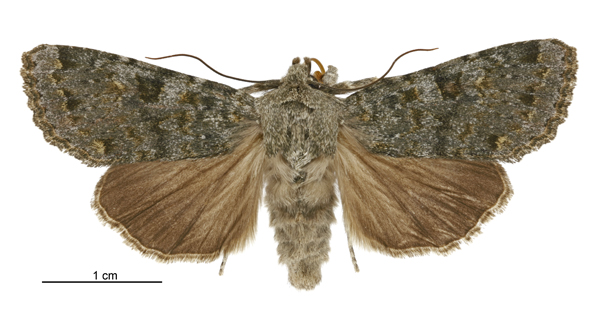
- Female
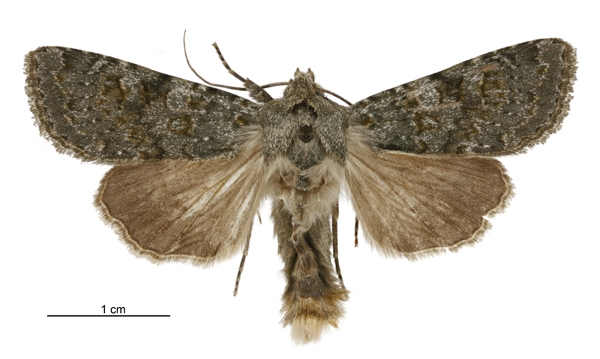
- Male

Scientific classification
- Kingdom: Animalia
- Phylum: Arthropoda
- Clade: Pancrustacea
- Class: Insecta
- Order: Lepidoptera
- Superfamily: Noctuoidea
- Family: Noctuidae
- Genus: Ichneutica
- Species: I. virescens

Binomial name
- Ichneutica virescens (Butler, 1879)

Synonyms
- Chera virescens Butler, 1879; Graphania virescens (Butler, 1879); Mythimna virescens (Butler, 1879); Aletia s.l. virescens (Butler, 1879); Aletia virescens (Butler, 1879)

= Ichneutica virescens =

Species of moth, also known as owlet moth

Ichneutica virescens, also known as the greater alpine grey, is a moth of the family Noctuidae. It is endemic to New Zealand, and is found in the southern North Island and throughout the South Island. The species is found in alpine, sub-alpine, and down to sea-level in grassland habitats. Adults are on the wing from November through to April. The likely larval host may be grasses, but larvae have been reared on a range of plants. The adults are similar to I. panda, I. falsidica and I. nobilia, but is distinguished by size, wing colouration, and antennae formation.

== Taxonomy ==
This species was described by Arthur Gardiner Butler in 1879 from an unspecified number of specimens obtained from Frederick Hutton at the Otago Museum and collected from Otago. Butler originally named the species Chera virescens. The holotype specimen is a female held at the Natural History Museum, London.

In earlier literature the species is known as Leucania griseipennis or Aletia griseipennis as a result of Edward Meyrick incorrectly interpreting the name griseipennis Felder & Rogenhofer. J. S. Dugdale, in his catalogue of New Zealand Lepidoptera, revised the incorrect synonymy given by Meyrick and placed this species within the Aletia genus. In 2019 Robert Hoare undertook a major review of New Zealand Noctuidae. During this review the genus Ichneutica was greatly expanded and the genus Aletia was subsumed into that genus as a synonym. As a result of this review, this species is now known as Ichneutica viriscens.

== Description ==
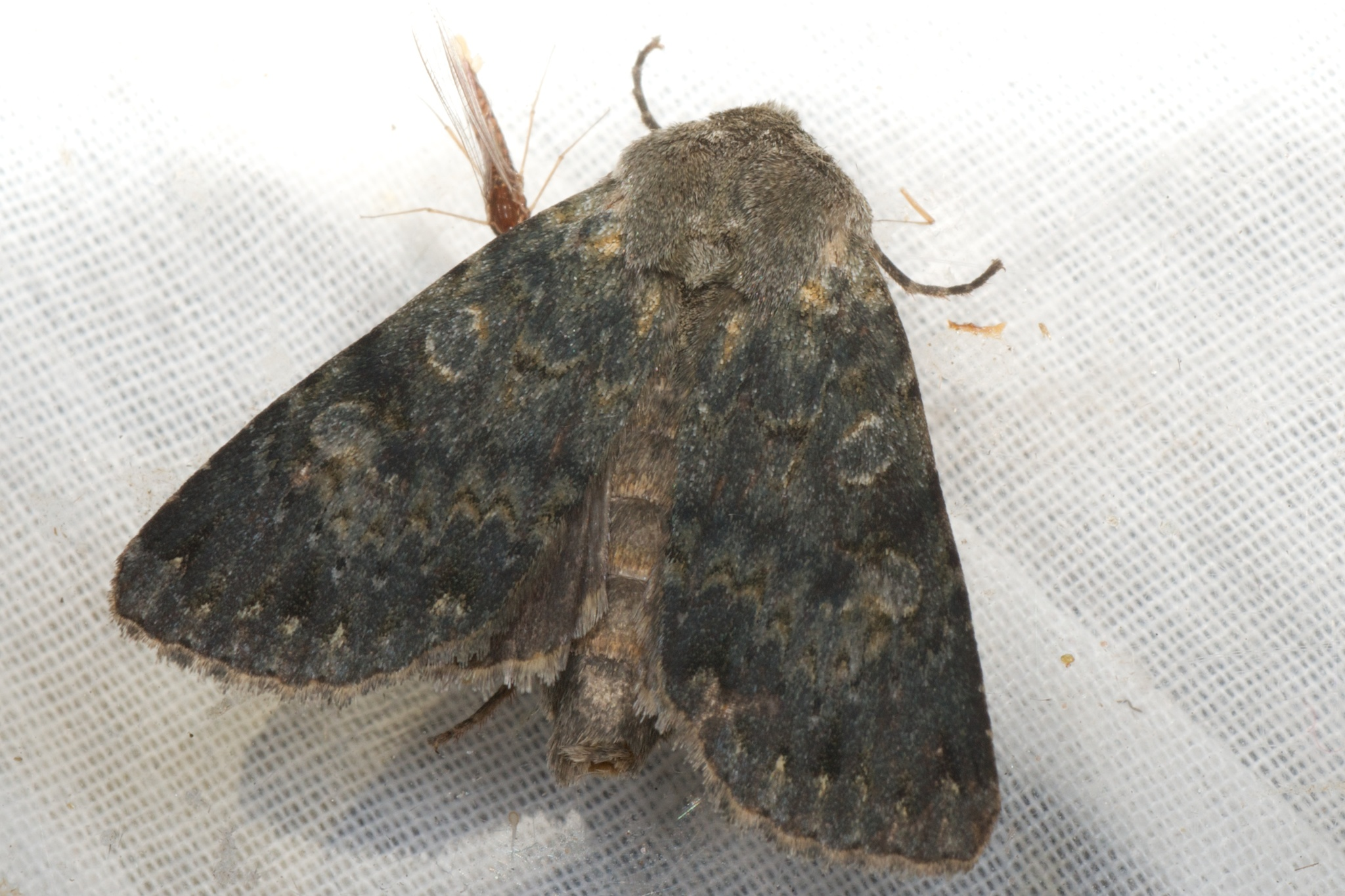
Observation of live Ichneutica virescens

Butler described the species as follows:

Primaries above greyish-green, with black costal spots indicating the origin of the usual lines; all the lines and spots black or blackish. margined either outwardly or inwardly with pale ochraceous; the discoidal spots and a spot below the orbicular indicated in outline; an oblique zigzag line from the reniform to the inner margin, followed by a subangulated series of lunate markings from costa to inner margin, an extradiscal series of ill-formed hastate subconfluent black spots parallel to the outer margin; fringe blackish towards the apex; secondaries sericeous grey with a feeble lilacine tint; a broad deep brownish grey external border; fringe yellowish at base, tipped with white and intersected by a grey line; thorax greyish-green, abdomen sordid whitish, sericeous; anus yellowish; under surface of wings silvery-greyish, the primaries with the costal and external borders finely white-speckled but not distinctly; an ochraceous tuft close to the base covering a bare and swollen space at the base of the costal vein; a slightly arched grey discal line; internal area white at base; secondaries paler than primaries; the fringe yellowish at base; an arched grey discal line; discocellulars greyish: body below sordid white. Expanse of wings 1 inch 10 lines.

The wingspan of the female of this species is between 40 and 49 mm and for the male is between 42 and 46 mm. I. virescens is similar in appearance to I. panda and I. falsidica, although both these latter species are smaller in size. The forewing markings of I. virescens are "much more distinct" than in I. nobilia. Fresh specimens can be distinguished from the smaller I. panda through the scaling of the inner edge of the subterminal line. This scaling has three patches in I. virescens, which are absent I. panda. I. falsidica can be distinguished by the pectinations of the male antennae, and by colour differences in the wing.

== Distribution ==
It is endemic to New Zealand. It is found in the southern North Island and throughout the South Island, but is not known from any offshore islands. George Hudson described it as very common on Mount Taranaki, and extremely abundant on the lower slopes of Mount Aurum in Otago and at up to around 3,000 feet (910 m) altitude at Mount Earnslaw / Pikirakatahi.

== Habitat ==
This species is known from grassland habitat.

== Behaviour ==
The larvae are likely to pupate under rocks. Adults of this species are on the wing from November to April, although most observations have been in the January to March period. Generally nocturnal, it is known to sometimes fly by day.

== Life history and host species ==
Illustration by Hudson of a young larva of I. virescens

George Hudson describes the egg as approximately 0.8mm, and pale yellowish white. The adult larvae are about 38mm long, with a light green shiny head and a body which is "very vivid green, paler and bluer underneath", with a "conspicuous yellowish sub-dorsal line and a broad white lateral line".

Hudson described the larva as "no doubt" feeding on native grasses, although Hoare reports that this is not accepted by White, and that the host-range of the larvae requires further investigation. Larval specimens have been reared on Epilobium, Coriaria plumosa, and Blechnaceae ferns.
