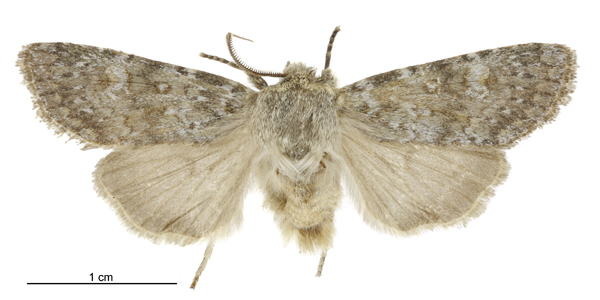
- Male
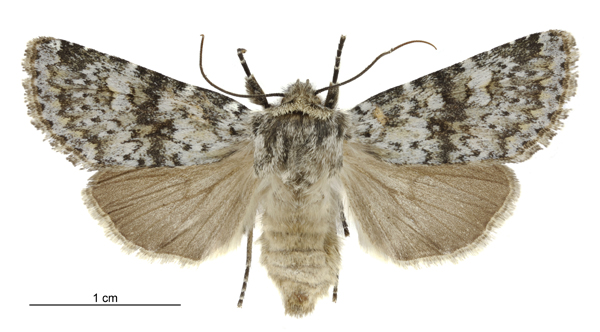
- Female

Scientific classification
- Kingdom: Animalia
- Phylum: Arthropoda
- Clade: Pancrustacea
- Class: Insecta
- Order: Lepidoptera
- Superfamily: Noctuoidea
- Family: Noctuidae
- Genus: Ichneutica
- Species: I. panda

Binomial name
- Ichneutica panda (Philpott, 1920)

Synonyms
- Aletia panda Philpott, 1920; Mythimna panda (Philpott, 1920); Aletia s.l. panda (Philpott, 1920); Aletia argentaria Howes, 1945; Mythimna argentaria (Howes, 1945); Aletia s.l. argentaria (Howes, 1945)

= Ichneutica panda =

Species of moth

Ichneutica panda is a species of moth in the family Noctuidae. It is endemic to New Zealand and only found in central and southern parts of the South Island. The species has not been collected in Canterbury since the late 1950s and has not been seen at the Wilderness Scientific Reserve since 1941. This species is similar in appearance to Ichneutica falsidica however I. panda lack or have indistinct black dashes on their edge of their hindwings. I. panda inhabit shrubland from alpine zones down to river terraces and adults are on the wing between December and February. The life history of this species is unknown as is the host species of the larvae.

== Taxonomy ==
This species was first described by Alfred Philpott in 1920 from a male collected by George Hudson at Mount Earnslaw / Pikirakatahi and a female collected by Philpott at Routeburn. Philpott named the species Aletia panda. The male lectotype specimen is held at Museum of New Zealand Te Papa Tongarewa. The argentaria form of this species was first described by George Howes in 1945 using a specimen collected by him at The Wilderness scientific reserve in Southland under the name Aletia argentaria.

Prior to 2019, the genus level classification of New Zealand endemic moths within the genus Aletia was regarded as unsatisfactory and was due for revision. As such this species has previously been known as Aletia (s.l.) panda as well as Aletia (s.l.) argentaria. In 2019 Robert Hoare undertook a major review of New Zealand Noctuidae. During this review the genus Ichneutica was greatly expanded and the genus Aletia was subsumed into that genus as a synonym. As a result of this review, this species is now known as Ichneutica panda. During this review Hoare also synonymised Aletia argentaria with I. panda.

== Description ==
The original description of this species given by Philpott is as follows:

♂, 33 mm.; ♀, 36 mm. Head and palpi grey, in ♂ tinged with ochreous. Antennae in S strongly bipectinated. Thorax grey, with dark bar on collar, crests absent. Abdomen greyish-ochreous. Legs greyish-ochreous, anterior tarsi blackish annulated with ochreous. Forewings, costa almost straight, apex rounded, termen oblique, evenly rounded; bluish-gxey, tinged with ochreous, in ♀ mixed with blackish-fuscous; a black dot on costa at base, margined broadly with whitish; first line faintly indicated, irregularly dentate, fuscous, margined anteriorly with whitish; second line from 1/2 costa to 3/5 dorsum, deeply and widely indented on upper half, irregularly dentate on lower half, blackish; a thin dentate fuscous pre-subterminal line, curving beneath reniform and closely approaching second line, thence running parallel with it to dorsum, apex of teeth margined with white; subterminal line obscure, margined anteriorly, in ♂ narrowly, in ♀ broadly, with fuscous; a series of fuscous dots round termen; orbicular circular, pale, interruptedly margined with fuscous; claviform directly beneath orbicular, circular, half as large as, and similar in colouring to, orbicidar; reniform pale, faintly fuscous-margined : cilia ochreous with basal and post-median fuscous lines. Hind wings in ♂ ochreous-fuscous, in ♀ fuscous : cilia ochreous, in ♀ with obscure fuscous line.

The argentaria form of this species was described by Howes as follows:

Expanse, 37 mm. Head clothed with a mixture of grey and ochreous scales. Palpi not prominent and short tipped. Antennae grey-brown, with finely ciliated pectinations—pectinations twice the width of shaft. Thorax clothed with a mixture of dark grey and yellowish brown hairs. Abdomen ochreous, with well developed tufts at sides and posterior. Forewings, general colour, stone grey. Basal line dark grey, margined outwardly with light grey. First line very indistinct—hardly discernable. Second line dark, but thin and rather faint. Subterminal line projects outwards towards termen at just below apex and continues on down to dorsum with a series of very small outward indentations on the vein crossings. Subterminal area stone grey, with very small ochreous spots bordering the subterminal line between the veins. The rest of the wing surface is stone grey with a very dark grey suffused band running from costa between reniform and orbicular to dorsum. A similar darker band crosses the wing just before the subterminal line. Reniform, orbicular, and claviform are stone grey centred and outlined in dark grey. The reniform also has two small central patches of ochreous scales. Cilia grey, with a dark grey line at base. Veins are outlined by darker marks towards the termen and half-way between termen and reniform a series of light grey dots crosses the wing. Hind Wings pale ochreous, darker towards termen. Cilia ochreous, paler at tips. This species, while having a strong superficial resemblance to Aletia moderato, is readily distinguished by having moderately pectinated antennae.

The argentaria form was regarded by George Hudson as being very similar to Aletia panda, differing only in having narrower forewings, more oblique termen and smaller orbicular stigma. Hoare formally synonymised argentaria with panda as although the argentaria from is smaller and more uniform in colour the wingspan falls within the wingspan range of panda, the genitalia of argentaria specimens show no differences to panda and, although argentaria has a variable forewing pattern, that difference is not sufficient to justify being classified as a separate species.

More strongly marked forms of I. panda can be confused with I. falsidica. However the antennae of male I. panda have shorter pectinations and both the male and female I. panda lack or have unclearly defined dark dash marks on their hindwing termen in comparison to the more vivid marks in specimens of I. falsidica.

== Distribution ==
This species is endemic to New Zealand. It is only found in the central and southern parts of the South Island. Although this species has been collected in Canterbury, this was over 60 years ago with a specimen collected at Arthur's Pass in 1958 and at Bealey River in 1959. It has also not been recollected at the Wilderness Scientific Reserve since 1941.

== Habitat ==
The preferred habitat of this species is shrublands in alpine and subalpine zones as well as in river terraces.

== Behaviour ==
Adults of this species are on the wing between December and February.

== Life history and host species ==
The life history of this species is unknown as are the host species of its larvae.
