= Pulque curado =

Traditional Mexican beverage

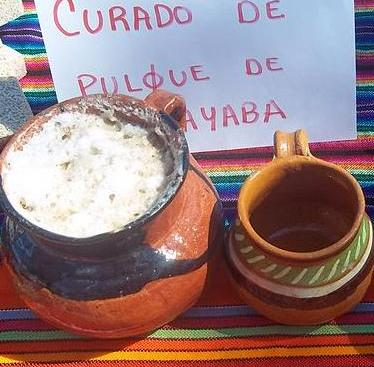
- Pulque curado and xoconostle sauce
- Type: alcoholic drink
- Origin: Mexico
- Introduced: 19th century
- Color: white, yellow, orange, brown, pink, red, violet
- Ingredients: pulque, fruits, honey

Pulque curado is a typical Mexican beverage, prepared with pulque, fruit, and a sweetener such as honey or sugar. It is considered a traditional Mexican drink.

The curing process arose from the need to "cure" pulque, a product that ferments rapidly and develops a very aggressive acidity within a few hours. During the viceroyalty period, merchants and consumers began mixing pulque with crushed fruits, honey, and spices. The goal was to "cure" it, that is, to soften its acidity and extend its shelf life.

== History ==
=== Origins and apogee ===
While pulque has existed since pre-Hispanic times, its flavored preparation originated during the Spanish colonization, which led to the abolition of strict laws against drunkenness. During this period, the consumption of alcoholic beverages like pulque began to spread widely. Pulque and its flavored form experienced their heyday between the 19th and early 20th centuries, with railway lines being built dedicated to transporting the drink, enriching the variety of flavored pulques prepared in the country.

=== Decline in the 20th Century ===
With the Mexican Revolution of 1910, the consumption of pulque and its flavored form declined due to agrarian reform and smear campaigns between the 1930s and 1940s, compounded by the rise of the beer and tequila industries, ending with the prohibition of pulque for health reasons, leaving it confined to rural and more traditional areas.

=== Resurgence in the 21st Century ===
At the beginning of the 21st century, pulque and its curated preparation saw a resurgence thanks to historians, cooks and mixers who have sought to bring back the ancient tradition with the emergence of new pulquerías and innovative recipes.

== Preparation ==
It is prepared by crushing the selected fruit and boiling it with a little water and sugar or honey until it thickens; it is then left to cool and mixed with pulque.

The most traditional pulque-based recipes include red prickly pears, strawberries, walnuts, and guava, as well as some with chocolate or chili. Nowadays, other fruits such as kiwifruit and pink pine nuts are also used.

In pulque shops, they are asked for by a nickname, which may contain an offensive relation or allude to its color, so for example, natural pulque is called "garlic pulque," because in popular Mexican slang it would mean "garlic-dipped" because it is natural and lacks sweeteners that would increase its cost.

== Bibliography ==
- Beltrán, Alberto (2016). Picardía mexicana (in Mexican Spanish). p. 268. ISBN 978-607-8295-33-3.
- Guerrero Guerrero, Raúl (1985). El pulque (in Mexican Spanish). J. Mortiz. p. 299. ISBN 9789682704994.
- Corcuera de Mancera, Sonia (September 2010). El fraile, el indio y el pulque - Evangelización y Embriaguez en la Nueva España (1523-1548) (in Mexican Spanish). p. 309. ISBN 9786071602183.
- Ramírez Rodríguez, Rodolfo (2018). La querella por el pulque. Auge y ocaso de una industria mexicana, 1890–1930 (in Mexican Spanish). El Colegio de Michoacán, A.C. ISBN 978-607-544-042-2.
- Ramírez Rodríguez, Rodolfo. "La importancia de la carga de pulque en los Ferrocarriles Nacionales de México, 1890-1930". Mirada Ferroviaria (in Mexican Spanish).
