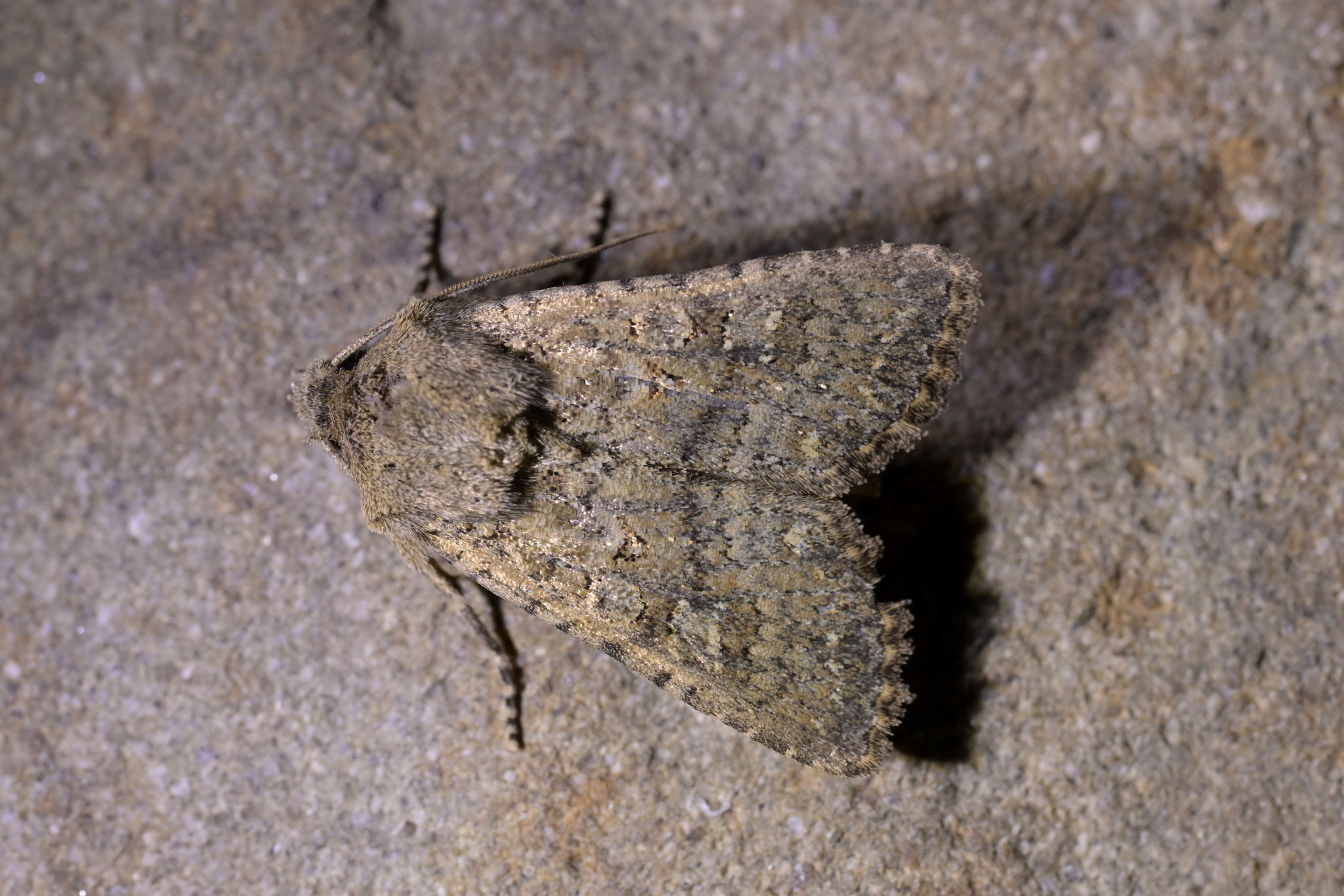

Scientific classification
- Kingdom: Animalia
- Phylum: Arthropoda
- Clade: Pancrustacea
- Class: Insecta
- Order: Lepidoptera
- Superfamily: Noctuoidea
- Family: Noctuidae
- Genus: Ichneutica
- Species: I. omicron

Binomial name
- Ichneutica omicron (Hudson, 1898)

Synonyms
- Melanchra omicron Hudson, 1898; Graphania omicron (Hudson, 1898)

= Ichneutica omicron =

Species of moth

Ichneutica omicron is a species of moth in the family Noctuidae. It is endemic to New Zealand and found only in the middle and lower parts of the North Island. It is very similar in appearance to its sister species Ichneutica barbara. The life history of this species is unknown as are the host species of the larvae. The adults are on the wing in November and December. This species is classified as "At Risk, Naturally Uncommon" by the Department of Conservation.

== Taxonomy ==
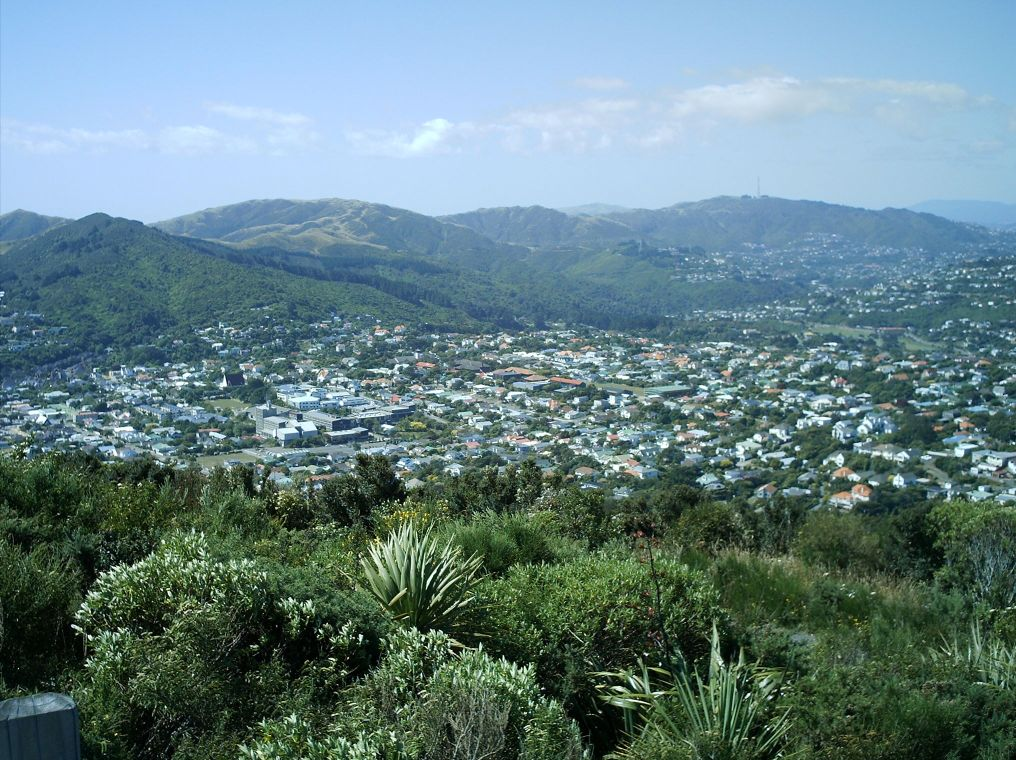
Karori, type locality of this species

This species was first described and illustrated by George Hudson in 1898 and named Melanchra omicron. It was discovered by Albert Norris in Karori, Wellington. The type specimen is missing and has not been found at Museum of New Zealand Te Papa Tongarewa. The neotype can be found in the New Zealand Arthropod Collection. In 1928 Hudson, thinking M. omicron was the same species as Aletia inconstans, discussed it under the latter name in his book The Butterflies and Moths of New Zealand. In 1939 Hudson reinstated M. omicron as a separate species. In 1988 John S. Dugdale placed this species within the genus Graphania. In 2019 Robert Hoare undertook a major review of New Zealand Noctuidae. During this review the genus Ichneutica was greatly expanded and the genus Graphania was subsumed into that genus as a synonym. As a result of this review, this species is now known as Ichneutica omicron.

== Description ==
Hudson described the species as follows:

The expansion of the wings is about 1 1/2 inches. The fore-wings are pale olive-green, mottled and striped with dull grey; there is a double transverse line near the base, another at about one-fourth, and another at about one-half, passing between the orbicular and the reniform; beyond this, there are two indistinct shaded lines, and a terminal series of black marks; the orbicular is large, almost circular, and sharply outlined in black; the claviform is small and indistinct, and the reniform ill-defined, obscurely outlined in black towards the base. The hind-wings are brownish-grey, darker towards the termen.

This species is almost indistinguishable visually from its sister species I. barbara. The only visual difference is in the males with I. barbara having a yellowish anal tuft where as the male of the I. omicron has a grey anal tuft. However I. barbara is only known from the South Island and so confusion between the species is unlikely.

== Distribution ==
This species is endemic to New Zealand. This species is known from the North Island only and has been observed in the central and southern parts of the North Island.

== Biology and behaviour ==
The life history of this species is unknown as are the host species of its larvae. The adults of this species is on the wing in November and December.

== Host species and habitat ==
This species has been collected in shrubland habitats including Olearia shrubland. Specimens have also been collected in dunes on the coast as well as inland volcanic dunes.

== Conservation status ==
This species has been classified as having the "At Risk, Naturally Uncommon" conservation status under the New Zealand Threat Classification System.
