= Yellow pine =

Informal group of similar species of pine tree

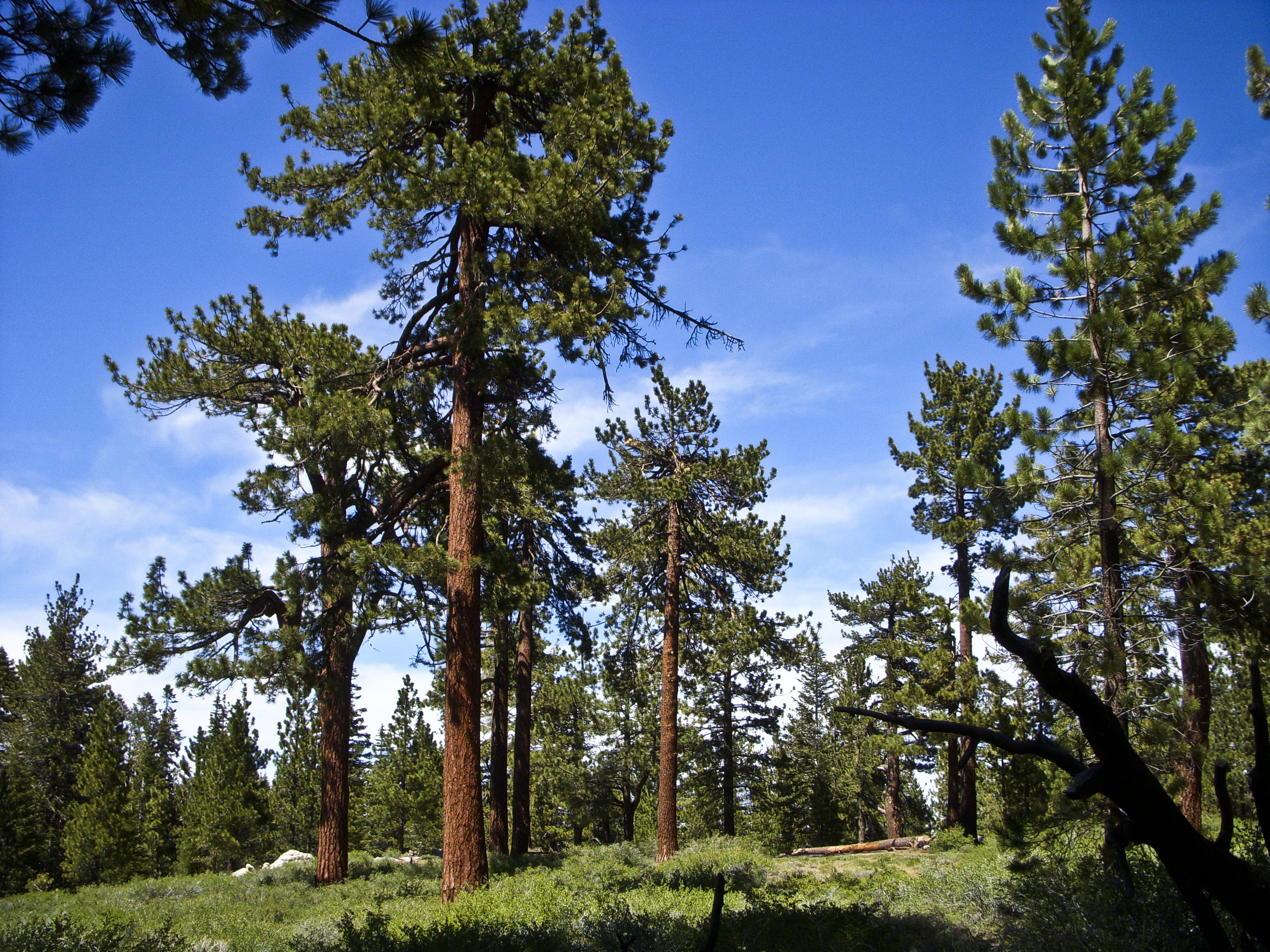
Jeffrey pine forest on Mount Pinos, California

In ecology and forestry, yellow pine refers to a number of conifer species that tend to grow in similar plant communities and yield similar strong wood. In the Western United States, yellow pine refers to Jeffrey pine or ponderosa pine. In the Southeastern United States, yellow pine refers to longleaf pine, shortleaf pine, slash pine, or loblolly pine. In the United Kingdom, yellow pine refers to eastern white pine or Scots pine. In New Zealand, it refers to Halocarpus biformis.

== Western United States ==
The Jeffrey pine and the ponderosa pine are common in drier montane areas of the Sierra Nevada. They are often confused by casual observers. Across much of the remainder of the American West, Jeffrey pine is absent, with ponderosa pine being the sole yellow pine.

Jeffrey pine is more stress tolerant than ponderosa pine in the Sierra Nevada. At higher elevations, on poorer (including ultramafic) soils, in colder climates, and in drier climates, Jeffrey pine replaces ponderosa as the dominant tree (Jeffrey pine forest). Ponderosa pine-dominated forests ("Ponderosa pine forest") occur at elevations from about 300 to 2,100 m (980 to 6,890 ft). Jeffrey pine-dominated forests occur mostly in California, from 1,500 to 2,400 m (4,900 to 7,900 ft) in the north, and 1,700 to 2,800 m (5,600 to 9,200 ft) in the south. The highest elevations are typically on the east side of the Sierra Nevada. "Eastside pine forest" refers to areas of Lassen National Forest, Plumas National Forest, and Tahoe National Forest, all on the east of the Sierra Nevada crest, where ponderosa and Jeffrey pine codominate.

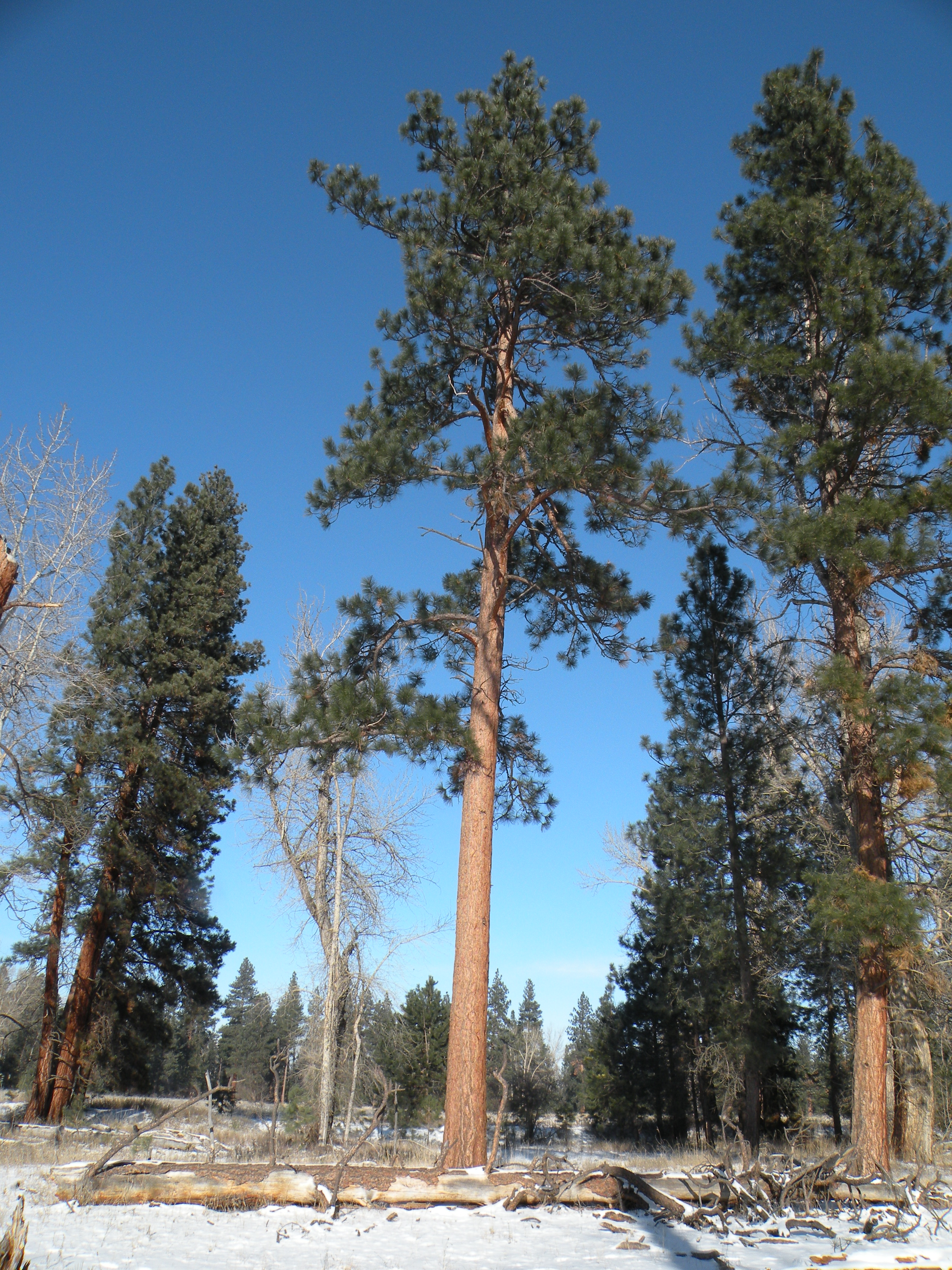
A group of ponderosa pine trees

Ponderosa pine forests occurs on the Colorado Plateau and in the Sierra Nevada of the Western United States, as well as other parts of North America.

One way to distinguish between them is by their cones. Each has barbs at the end of the scales. The sharp Jeffrey pine cone scale barbs point inward, so the cone feels smooth to the palm of one's hand when rubbed down the cone. Ponderosa pine cone scale barbs point outward, so feel sharp and prickly to the palm of one's hands. Another distinguishing characteristic is that the needles of Jeffrey pine are glaucous, less bright green than those of ponderosa pine, and by the stouter, heavier cones with larger seeds and inward-pointing barbs.

Jeffrey pine wood and ponderosa pine wood are sold together as yellow pine. Both kinds of wood are hard (with a Janka hardness of 550 lbf (2,400 N)), but the western yellow pine wood is less dense than southern yellow pine wood (28 lb/cu ft (0.45 g/cm^{3}) versus 35 lb/cu ft (0.56 g/cm^{3}) for shortleaf pine).

== Southern United States ==
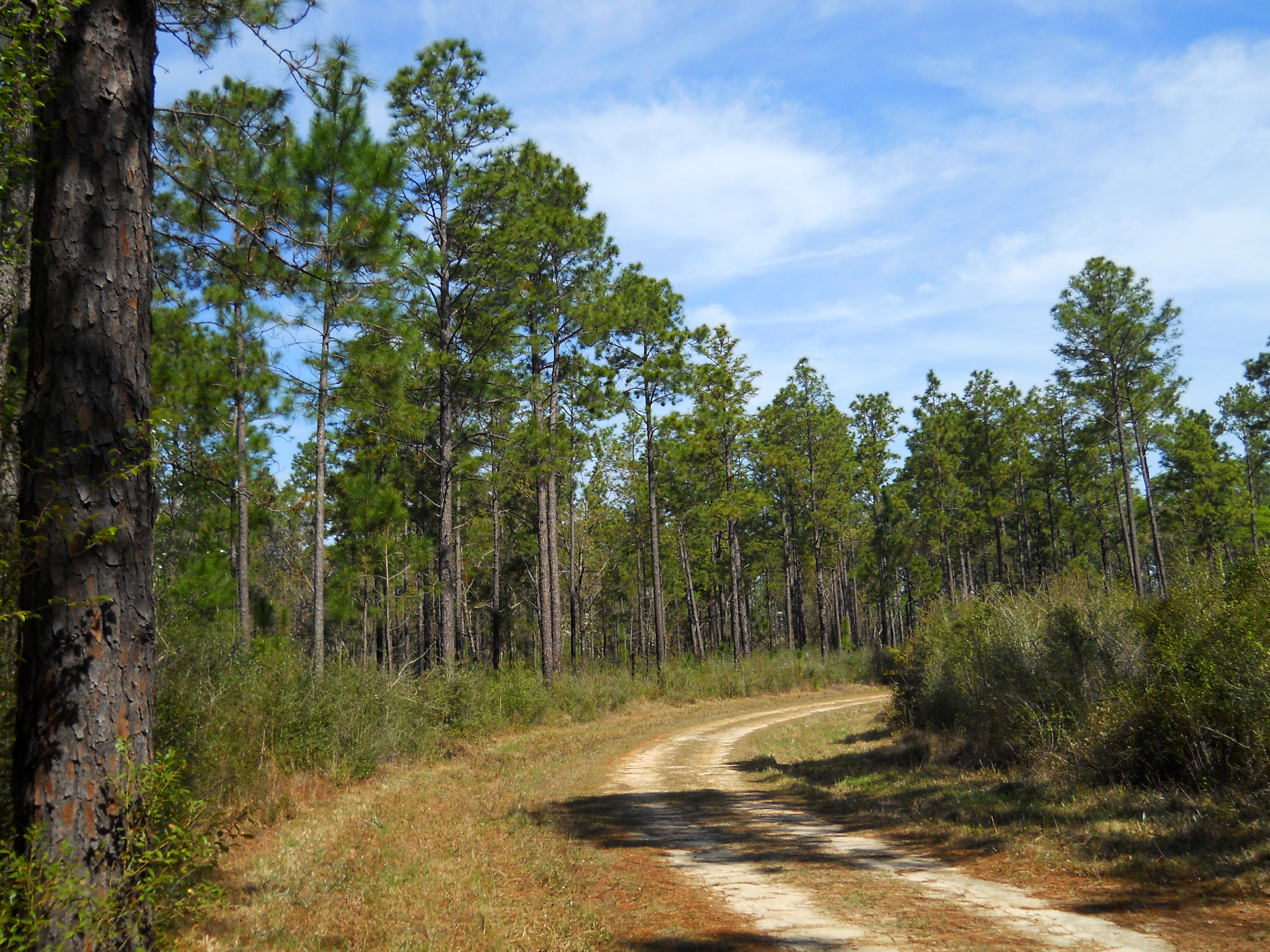
Southern yellow pines in De Soto National Forest

In the Southern United States, yellow pines can refer to one of the native species: loblolly, longleaf, shortleaf, or slash pines. These yellow pines grow very well in the acidic red clay soil found in most of the region. The wood from the southern yellow pines typically has a density value between 50 and 55 lb/cu ft (0.80 and 0.88 g/cm^{3}) when pressure treated. Yellow pine grows across the South and Mid-Atlantic regions, from Texas to New Jersey.

Dimensional lumber and plywood products manufactured from southern yellow pine are used extensively in home construction in the United States. They are also used for wooden roller coasters and are most used for utility poles throughout the United States.

== New Zealand ==
Halocarpus biformis, a species of podocarp, is known as yellow pine in New Zealand. It is a tight-grained, sweet-smelling, and extremely durable wood.
