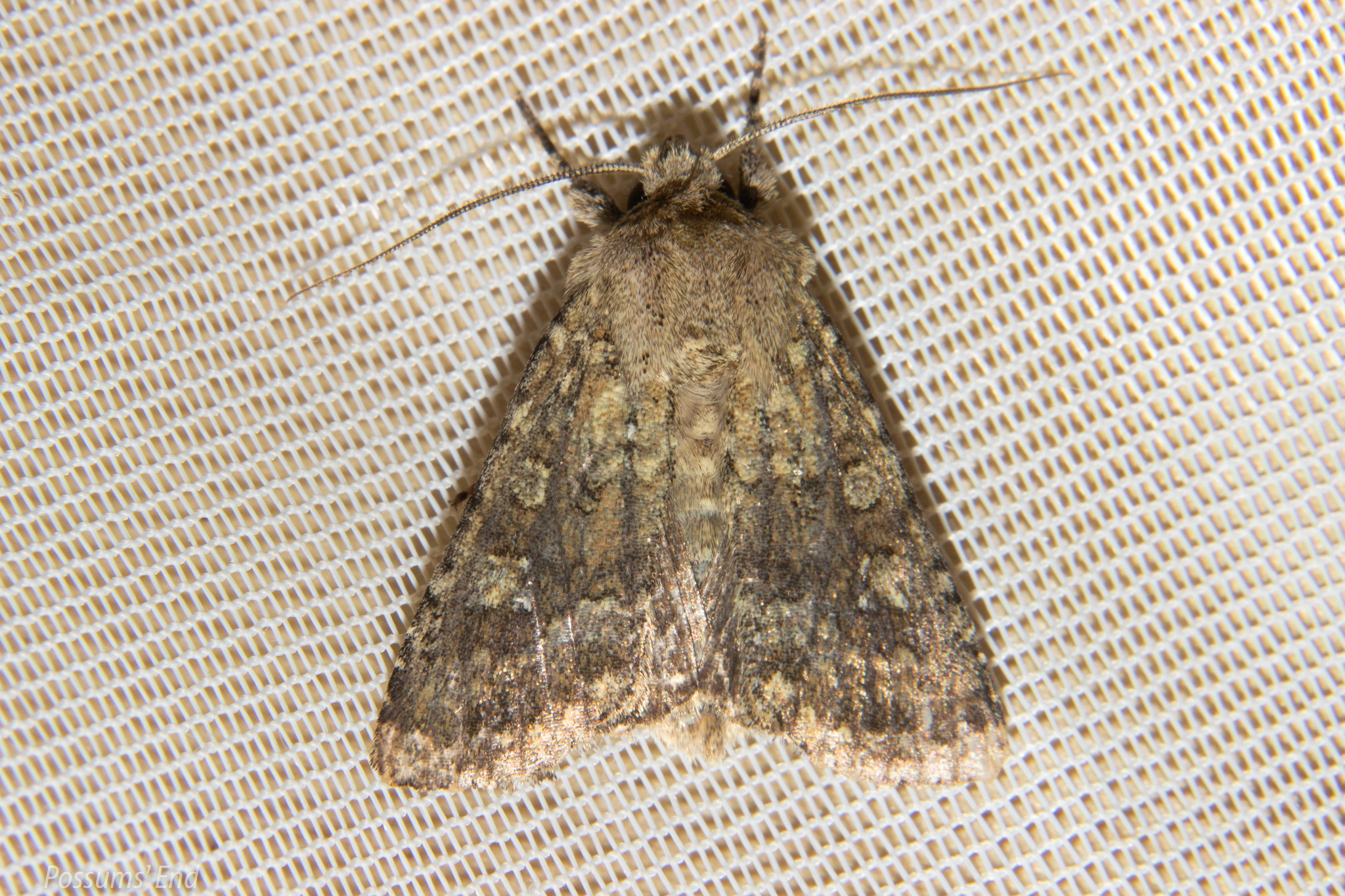

Scientific classification
- Kingdom: Animalia
- Phylum: Arthropoda
- Clade: Pancrustacea
- Class: Insecta
- Order: Lepidoptera
- Superfamily: Noctuoidea
- Family: Noctuidae
- Genus: Ichneutica
- Species: I. barbara

Binomial name
- Ichneutica barbara Hoare, 2019

= Ichneutica barbara =

Species of moth

Ichneutica barbara is a moth of the family Noctuidae. This species is endemic to New Zealand and is only found in the South Island, more commonly on the eastern side of the South Island. This species has a grey forewing and is visually very similar in appearance to its close relative I. omicron. However the adult male of I. barbara has a yellow anal tuft in comparison to the grey tuft of I. omicron. In collections I. barbara has sometimes been confused with I. sistens. I. barbara appears to inhabit shrubland localities. The life history of this species is unknown as are the host species of the larvae but adults are on the wing from October to December.

== Taxonomy ==
This species was first described by Robert Hoare in 2019 and named Ichneutica barbara in honour of New Zealand ecologist Dr Barbara Anderson. The holotype is a male specimen collected by Brian Patrick at Portobello in Dunedin in October and held in the New Zealand Arthropod Collection.

== Description ==
The adult of this species has a grey forewing and is almost indistinguishable visually from its sister species I. omicron. The only visual difference is in the males of those specie with I. barbara having a yellowish anal tuft where as the male of the I. omicron has a grey anal tuft. However with I. omicron appearing to only be present in the North Island and I. barbara only present in the South Island it is unlikely these two will be confused in the wild.

The adult male of this species has a wingspan of between 32 and 37 mm and the female has a wingspan of between 33 and 36 mm.

== Distribution ==
This species is endemic to New Zealand and is found only in the South Island mainly in the eastern side of that island.

== Habitat ==
This species is thought to possibly to inhabit shrubland localities.

== Behaviour ==
The adults of this species are on the wing between October and December.

== Life history and host species ==
The life history of this species is unknown as are the host species of its larvae.
