= Barbara Anderson =

Barbara Anderson may refer to:

- Barbara Anderson (writer) (1926–2013), New Zealand fiction writer
- Barbara Anderson (actress) (born 1945), American actress
- Barbara Anderson (The Young and the Restless)
- Barbara Anderson (athlete), British Paralympic athlete
- Barbara McDermott (1912–2008), née Anderson, Lusitania survivor
- Barbara Anderson (scientist), New Zealand ecologist
- Barbara Anderson (anti-tax activist) (1943–2016), American anti-tax activist
- Bárbara Anderson (born 1973), Argentinian journalist and disability rights activist

== See also ==
- Barbara Andersen (disambiguation)
