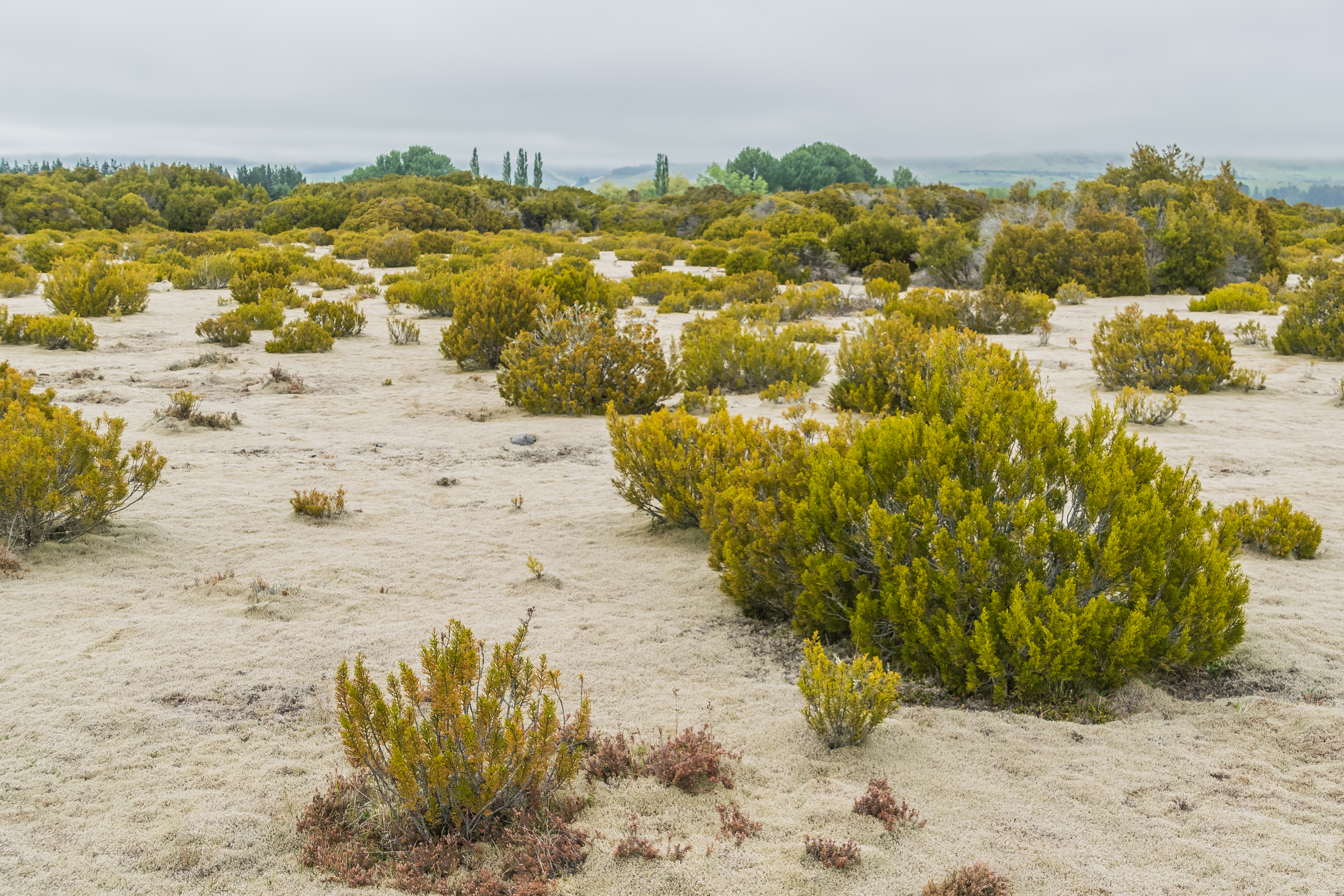
- Halocarpus bidwillii in Wilderness Scientific Reserve, Southland region, South Island of New Zealand

Scientific classification
- Kingdom: Plantae
- Clade: Tracheophytes
- Clade: Gymnosperms
- Division: Pinophyta
- Class: Pinopsida
- Order: Araucariales
- Family: Podocarpaceae
- Genus: Halocarpus; Quinn

Type species
- Halocarpus bidwillii (J. D. Hooker ex Thomas Kirk) Quinn

Species
- H. bidwillii (Hook.f. ex Kirk) Quinn; H. biformis (Hook.) Quinn; H. kirkii (F.Muell. ex Parl.) Quinn

= Halocarpus =

Genus of conifers

Halocarpus is a genus of dioecious conifers in the family Podocarpaceae. The genus includes three closely related species of trees and shrubs, all endemic to New Zealand.

== Extant species ==
Phylogeny of Halocarpus

- - H. bidwillii
  - - H. biformis
    - H. kirkii

Three species are accepted as of July 2019:

Image	Scientific name	Common name	Distribution
	Halocarpus bidwillii (Hook.f. ex Kirk) Quinn	bog pine or mountain pine	New Zealand
	Halocarpus biformis (Hook.) Quinn	yellow pine or pink pine	New Zealand
	Halocarpus kirkii (F.Muell. ex Parl.) Quinn	monoao	New Zealand
