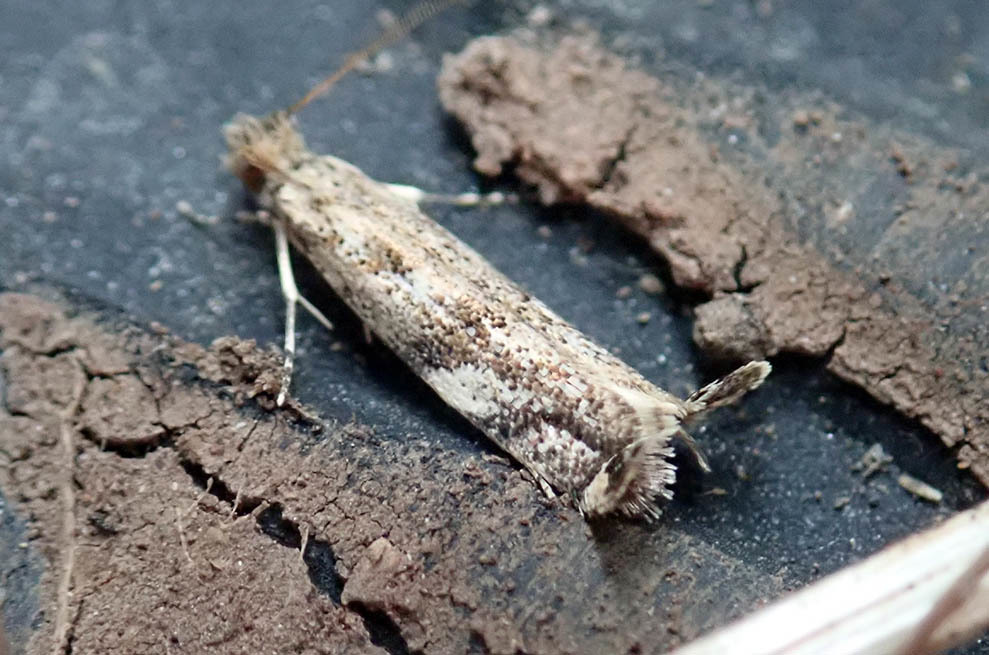

Scientific classification
- Kingdom: Animalia
- Phylum: Arthropoda
- Clade: Pancrustacea
- Class: Insecta
- Order: Lepidoptera
- Family: Tineidae
- Genus: Erechthias
- Species: E. acrodina

Binomial name
- Erechthias acrodina (Meyrick, 1912)

Synonyms
- Ereunetis acrodina Meyrick, 1912

= Erechthias acrodina =

Species of moth endemic to New Zealand

Erechthias acrodina is a species of moth of the family Tineidae. This species was first described by Edward Meyrick. It is endemic to New Zealand and is found in the North, South and the Chatham Islands. This species inhabits native forest often near Phormium species and have also been observed on dead Leptospermum scrub. Larvae has been reared from decaying Phormium leaves. Adults are on the wing from October to February.

== Taxonomy ==
It was described by Edward Meyrick in 1912 using a specimen collected by George Vernon Hudson in Wellington and named Ereunetis acrodina. In 1914 Meyrick assigned this species to the genus Erechthias. Alfred Philpott discussed this species under the name Erechthias acrodina in 1917. In 1927 Philpott studied and illustrated the male genitalia of this species. George Hudson discussed and illustrated this species in his 1928 book The butterflies and moths of New Zealand under that same name. In 1988 John S. Dugdale confirmed the placement of this species in the genus Erechthias. The female holotype is held at the Natural History Museum, London.

== Description ==
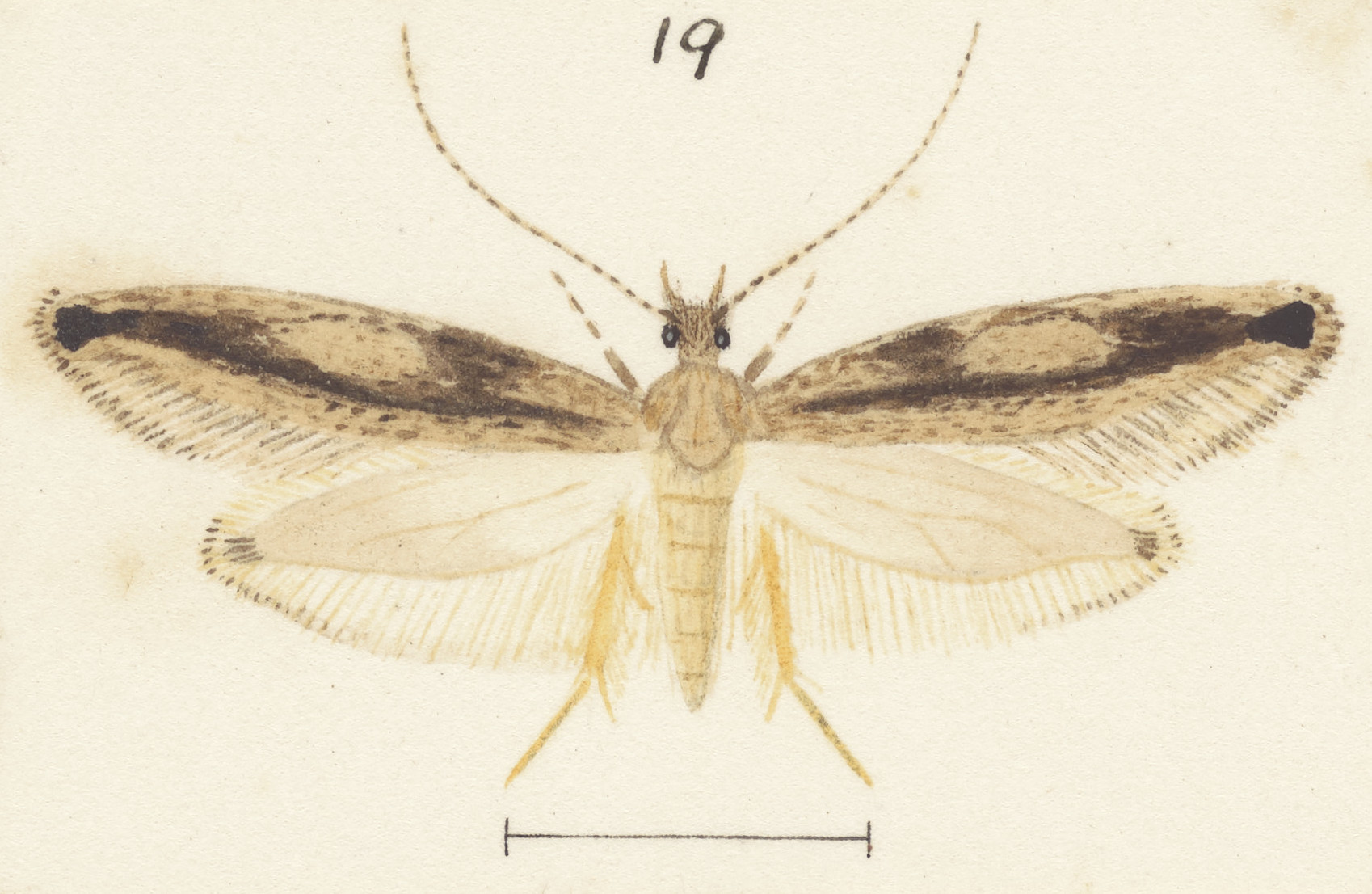
Illustration of E. acrodina.

Meyrick described this species as follows:

♀. 14 mm. Head whitish-ochreous, hairs of forehead slightly mixed with dark fuscous. Antennae grey-whitish, basal joint with a blackish spot. Palpi whitish, second joint streaked with dark fuscous above and beneath, terminal joint dark fuscous towards base. Thorax whitish-ochreous. shoulders with a dark-fuscous spot. Abdomen ochreous-whitish. Forewings elongate, narrow, costa moderately arched; apex round-pointed, upturned, termen extremely obliquely rounded; greyish-ochreous, with a few dark-fuscous scales; markings fuscous mixed with blackish; four oblique patches from costa, more or less confluent with a broad irregular submedian streak from near base to apex, first near base, second broadest, before middle, third narrow, fourth reduced to a streak; an irregular dark-fuscous apical spot surrounded with white : cilia whitish, with an interrupted black subbasal line, and fuscous post-median line, tips fuscous at apex. Hindwings grey-whitish; cilia whitish, at apex with two dark-grey lines.

Superficially this insect very closely resembles Erechthias fulguritella, but may be distinguished from that species by the oval pale brown patch near the costa, and the absence of any well-defined projections from the dorsal edge of the central streak.

== Distribution ==
This species is endemic to New Zealand. As well as the type locality of Wellington, this species has also been observed in Christchurch, Dunedin, the Takitimu Mountains, and at Lakes Te Anau and Manapouri and Bluff. This species has also been observed in Auckland and on the Chatham Islands.

== Habitat and hosts ==
This species inhabits native forest. In Auckland this species has been found in rocky places near Phormium on the coast. Larvae has been reared from decaying Phormium leaves.

== Behaviour ==
Adult of this species are on the wing in October to February. Adults have been observed on dead Leptospermum scrub.
