= Barbara Andersen =

Barbara Andersen may refer to:

- Barbara Andersen, magazine editor, see CITR-FM
- Barbara Andersen, character in Aux frontières du possible

== See also ==
- Barbara Anderson (disambiguation)
