= Barbara Anderson (scientist) =

New Zealand ecologist

Barbara J. Anderson
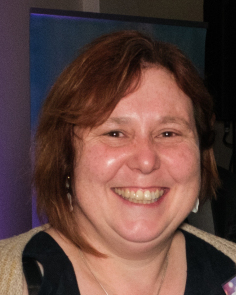
- Anderson in 2024
- Education: University of Otago (PhD)
- Scientific career
- Fields: Ecology
- Thesis: Something to do with community structure: the influence of sampling and analysis on measures of community structure (2006)

Barbara Jane Anderson is a New Zealand ecologist.

== Education ==
Anderson graduated with a PhD in botany from the University of Otago, Dunedin, in 2006.

== Research and career ==
Beginning in 2015, Anderson co-ordinated a citizen science project, Ahi Pepe MothNet, which encouraged members of the public to engage with moths at Orokonui Ecosanctuary. The project brought public attention to the role of moths in the ecosystem and also provides schoolchildren and adults with an experience of "hands-on" science. As a result of the interest in the project, a bilingual Māori–English guide to New Zealand moths was published in 2018. In 2017, a group of Dunedin schoolchildren were invited to present their experiences of the project to the World Indigenous People's Conference on Education in Toronto.

As of 2021 Anderson was the President of The Otago Institute for the Arts and Sciences.

IN 2019 Anderson was a Royal Society Rutherford Discovery Fellow based at Otago Museum working with the museum's insect collection.

== Notable achievements ==
In 2019, the New Zealand endemic moth species Ichneutica barbara was named in Anderson's honour.
