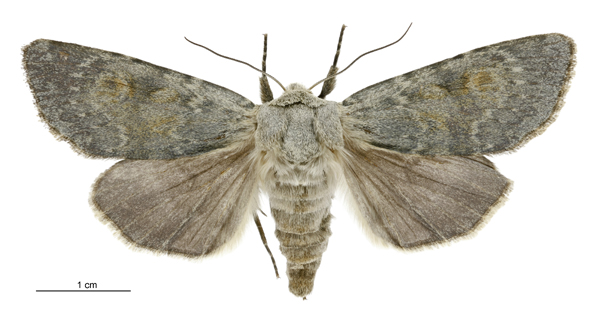
- Female
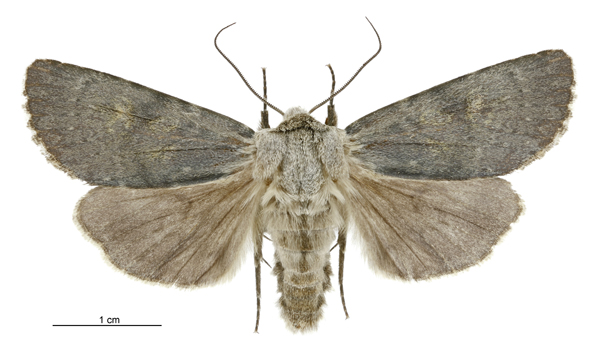
- Male

Scientific classification
- Kingdom: Animalia
- Phylum: Arthropoda
- Clade: Pancrustacea
- Class: Insecta
- Order: Lepidoptera
- Superfamily: Noctuoidea
- Family: Noctuidae
- Genus: Ichneutica
- Species: I. nobilia

Binomial name
- Ichneutica nobilia (Howes, 1946)

Synonyms
- Aletia nobilia Howes, 1946; Mythimna nobilia (Howes, 1946)

= Ichneutica nobilia =

Species of moth

Ichneutica nobilia is a moth of the family Noctuidae. This species is endemic to New Zealand and can be found in the South Island, although not in the Nelson, Dunedin or Southland regions. This species prefers rocky habitats in alpine zones and the blueish-grey sheen on the species' forewings help camouflage it. Adults of I. nobilia are on the wing from December to February and are attracted to light. The life history of this species is unknown as are the host species of its larvae.

== Taxonomy ==
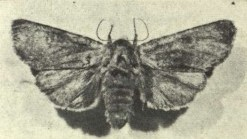
Image of Aletia nobilia in original description

This species was first described by George Howes in 1946 using 10 specimens collected at Homer and named Aletia nobilia. The lectotype, collected by Howes, is held in the Museum of New Zealand Te Papa Tongarewa. In 1988 J. S. Dugale discussed this species as being placed within the Aletia genus. In 1950 George Hudson, in his book Fragments of New Zealand entomology, also discussed this species under this name. In 2019 Robert Hoare undertook a major review of New Zealand Noctuidae species. During this review the genus Ichneutica was greatly expanded and the genus Aletia was subsumed into that genus as a synonym. As a result of this review, this species is now known as Ichneutica nobilia.

== Description ==
Howes described this species as follows:

Wing expanse varying, in males from 48 to 50 mm., in females from 45 to 54 mm. Head and thorax blueish-grey with the face lighter in shade. Antennae serrate, grey. Palpi very short. Forelegs blueish -grey. Forewings shining blueish-grey, with all markings extremely faint. Basal and first lines indistinct, but the first line shows plainly just above and down to dorsum; second line slightly indicated by a narrow darker shading on costa and on the vein crossings. Subterminal line slightly deeper in colour than main wing surface and narrowly edged outwardly with ochreous. Subterminal area blueish-grey. Reniform, orbicular, and claviform almost indistinguishable, but indicated by faint ochreous patches which are more noticeable in the female. Cilia white, with light brown-grey bars between vein endings in males; grey, with a grey-white basal line in females. There is no appearance of a lunule in the underwings, which are an even grey. Cilia of lower wings are grey-white in males, ochreous-white in females.

The males of this species have a wingspan of between 42 and 50 mm while the females have a wingspan of between 49 and 54 mm. The blueish-grey sheen on the forewings of this species mimics the colour of the rocks found in the habitat it prefers. This species can be confused with Ichneutica virescens, if the latter are worn. However the later can be distinguished as it has a scalloped shaped black median line markings as well as three small black patches on its forewings. Physetica caerulea can also possibly be confused with I. nobilia however the former is much smaller and has a pale yellowish shade to its underside.

== Distribution ==
This species is endemic to New Zealand and is found in the South Island. However it is not known from the Nelson, Dunedin or Southland regions. This species is abundant in the Rastus Burn Basin in The Remarkables.

== Habitat ==
This species is found in alpine zones in the South Island and prefers rocky habitats.

== Behaviour ==
Adults of this species are on the wing from December to February. It is a faster flying species and can remain active despite higher wind velocities. This species is attracted to light.

== Life history and host species ==
The life history of this species is unknown as are the host species of its larvae.
