= Takitimu Mountains =

Mountain range in Southland, New Zealand

Coordinates: 45°45′S 167°48′E

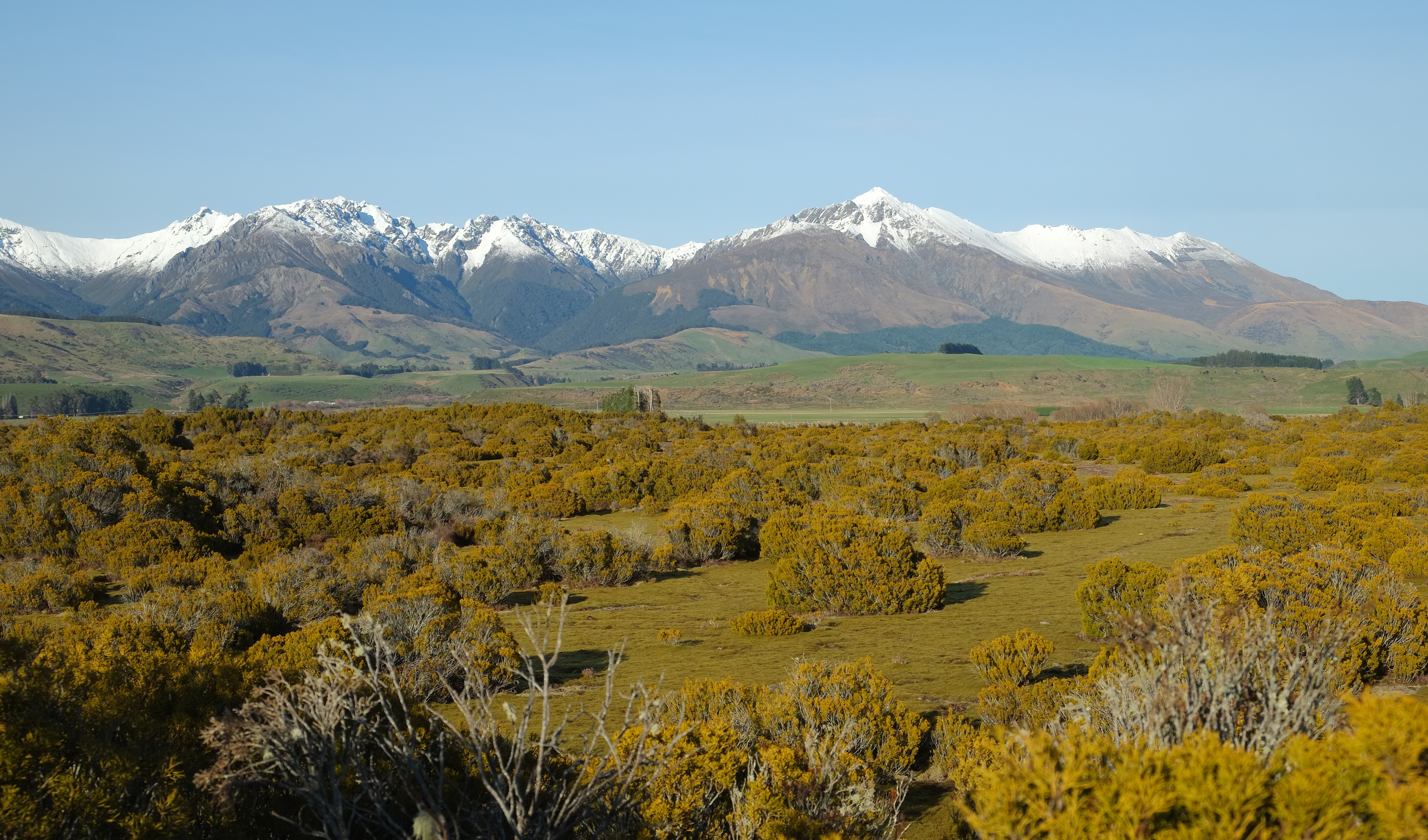
- Takitimu Mountains from north (Wilderness Scientific Reserve)

Highest point
- Peak: Brunel Peaks
- Elevation: 1,650 m (5,410 ft)

Dimensions
- Length: 30 km (19 mi)

Geography
- Country: New Zealand
- Region: Southland

The Takitimu Mountains are a mountain range in the Southland Region of New Zealand, that extend in a north–south direction southeast of Te Anau and Manapouri. The mountain range is about 30 kilometres (19 mi) long and contains several peaks of around 1,600 metres (5,200 ft) height, with the Brunel Peaks reaching 1,650 metres (5,410 ft).

In Māori mythology, the mountain range is special to Ngāi Tahu as it represents the upturned hull of the Tākitimu waka wrecked in Te Waewae Bay to the south of the Takitimu Mountains.
