= Ahi Pepe MothNet =

Citizen science initiative based in Otago, New Zealand

Ahi Pepe MothNet (styled Ahi Pepe | MothNet) is a citizen science initiative based in Otago, New Zealand that aims to raise the awareness of moths among teachers and students.

== Name ==
Ahi Pepe (Māori for moth fire) refers to a traditional proverb (whakataukī) of Te Whiti o Rongomai about firelight attracting moths (pepe) instead of muttonbirds (tītī).

== Activities ==
Ahi Pepe began in 2015 as a project with four Otago schools, and continued with funding from Participatory Science Platform, Unlocking Curious Minds, and the Biological Heritage National Science Challenge. Collaborators include Otago Museum, Orokonui Ecosanctuary, the University of Otago, Te Rūnanga o Ngāi Tahu, Landcare Research and schools across the South Island.

In October 2016, Ahi Pepe worked with Orokonui Ecosanctuary to install moth traps inside and outside the predator-proof fence, and school children worked alongside entomologists to identify the moths caught. The project has produced educational resources for schools in both English and Te Reo Māori. The South Island guide is the first educational resource to be written in the Kāi Tahu dialect.

In 2017, public donations enabled a delegation of Otago schoolchildren to give a presentation on Ahi Pepe at the World Indigenous Peoples Conference on Education in Toronto.

== Publications ==
- 2015 – Beginner’s Guide to the Otago Macro Moths
- 2016 – Puka Whakamārama o Te Pepe Nui - Beginners' Guide to the Macro Moths (South Island): eight booklets each covering a bioregion either in Kāi Tahu or English.
- 2017 – Puka Whakamārama o Te Pepe Nui - Beginners' Guide to the Macro Moths (North Island): eight booklets each covering a bioregion either in standard Te Reo Māori or English.

All publications are produced in English and Te Reo Māori editions.
