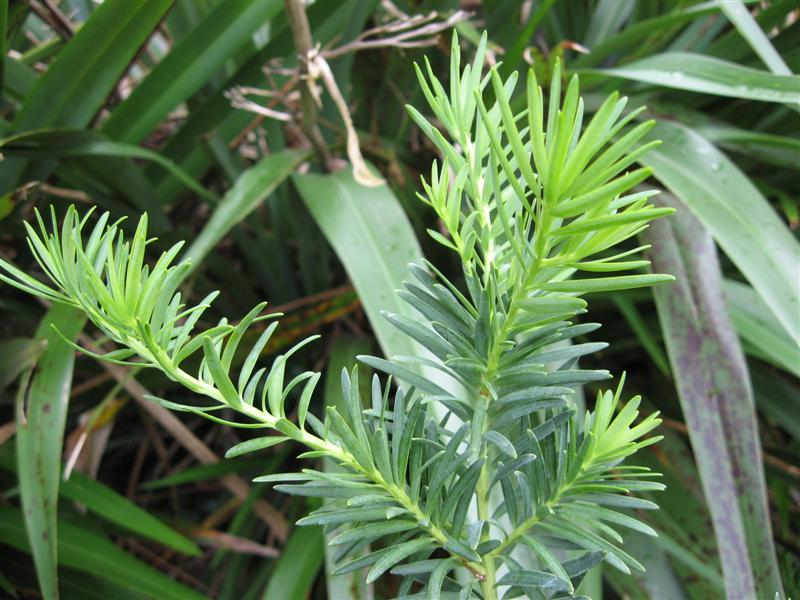
- Juvenile foliage

Conservation status
- Near Threatened (IUCN 3.1)

Scientific classification
- Kingdom: Plantae
- Clade: Tracheophytes
- Clade: Gymnosperms
- Division: Pinophyta
- Class: Pinopsida
- Order: Araucariales
- Family: Podocarpaceae
- Genus: Halocarpus
- Species: H. kirkii

Binomial name
- Halocarpus kirkii (F.Muell. ex Parl.) Quinn

Synonyms
- Dacrydium kirkii F.Muell. ex Parl.

= Halocarpus kirkii =

Species of conifer

Halocarpus kirkii, commonly known as monoao, is a species of dioecious conifer in the family Podocarpaceae. It is native and endemic to New Zealand.

== Etymology ==
This species is named in honour of the botanist Thomas Kirk.

== Description ==
When seen at a distance, it resembles a small kauri in its overall appearance. It can be usually distinguished by its juvenile foliage, which often remains on the lower branches until the tree grows to approximately 10 metres tall. The tree ultimately reaches a height of about 25 metres, with a trunk up to 1 metre thick and grey-brown bark that has a rough, pustular texture. The pale reddish-brown wood is strong and durable.

The leaves of the younger trees and on the lower branches of the adults are narrow and to some extent leathery, up to 4 cm long and 3 mm wide. The adult leaves are thick, scale-like and much smaller; the leaves overlap and lie appressed to the branchlets in 4 rows.

It is not a common tree, sometimes being found in lowland forests to an elevation of 700 metres in the north of the North Island and on Great Barrier Island.
