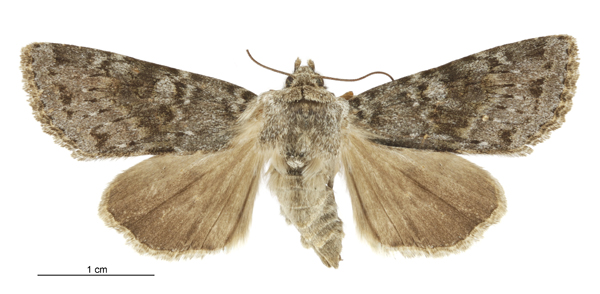
- Female
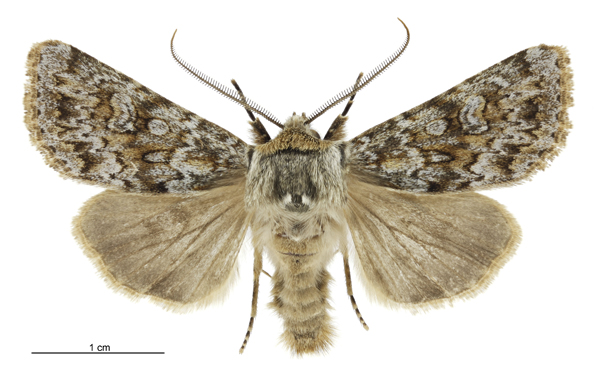
- Male

Scientific classification
- Kingdom: Animalia
- Phylum: Arthropoda
- Clade: Pancrustacea
- Class: Insecta
- Order: Lepidoptera
- Superfamily: Noctuoidea
- Family: Noctuidae
- Genus: Ichneutica
- Species: I. falsidica

Binomial name
- Ichneutica falsidica (Meyrick, 1911)

Synonyms
- Hyssia falsidica Meyrick, 1911; Hyssia hamiltoni Hampson, 1913; Mythimna falsidica (Meyrick, 1911); Aletia falsidica (Meyrick, 1911); Graphania falsidica (Meyrick, 1911)

= Ichneutica falsidica =

Species of moth

Ichneutica falsidica is a moth of the family Noctuidae. This species is endemic to New Zealand and is widespread in the South Island but can only be found in the Tararua Range and Mount Taranaki in the North Island. This species is similar looking to I. panda but I. falsidica has dark dashes on their hind-wings. This species can be found open high country and has been seen flying during the day in sunny warm weather. At night adults are attracted to light. The life history of this species is unknown as are the host species of the larvae.

== Taxonomy ==
I. falsidica was first described by Edward Meyrick in 1911 using a female specimen collected at Mt Arthur and named Hyssia falsidica. The holotype specimen is held at the Natural History Museum, London. In 1913 George Hampson also described the same species, using specimens including the lectotype male that was collected in the Tararua Range, and named it Hyssia hamiltoni. In his 1988 catalogue, J. S. Dugale stated that this species was placed within the Aletia genus and assigned to it two subspecies Aletia falsidica falsidica and Aletia falsidica hamiltoni. In 2019 Robert Hoare undertook a major review of New Zealand Noctuidae. During this review the genus Ichneutica was greatly expanded and the genus Aletia was subsumed into that genus as a synonym. As a result of this review, this species is now known as Ichneutica falsidica.

== Description ==
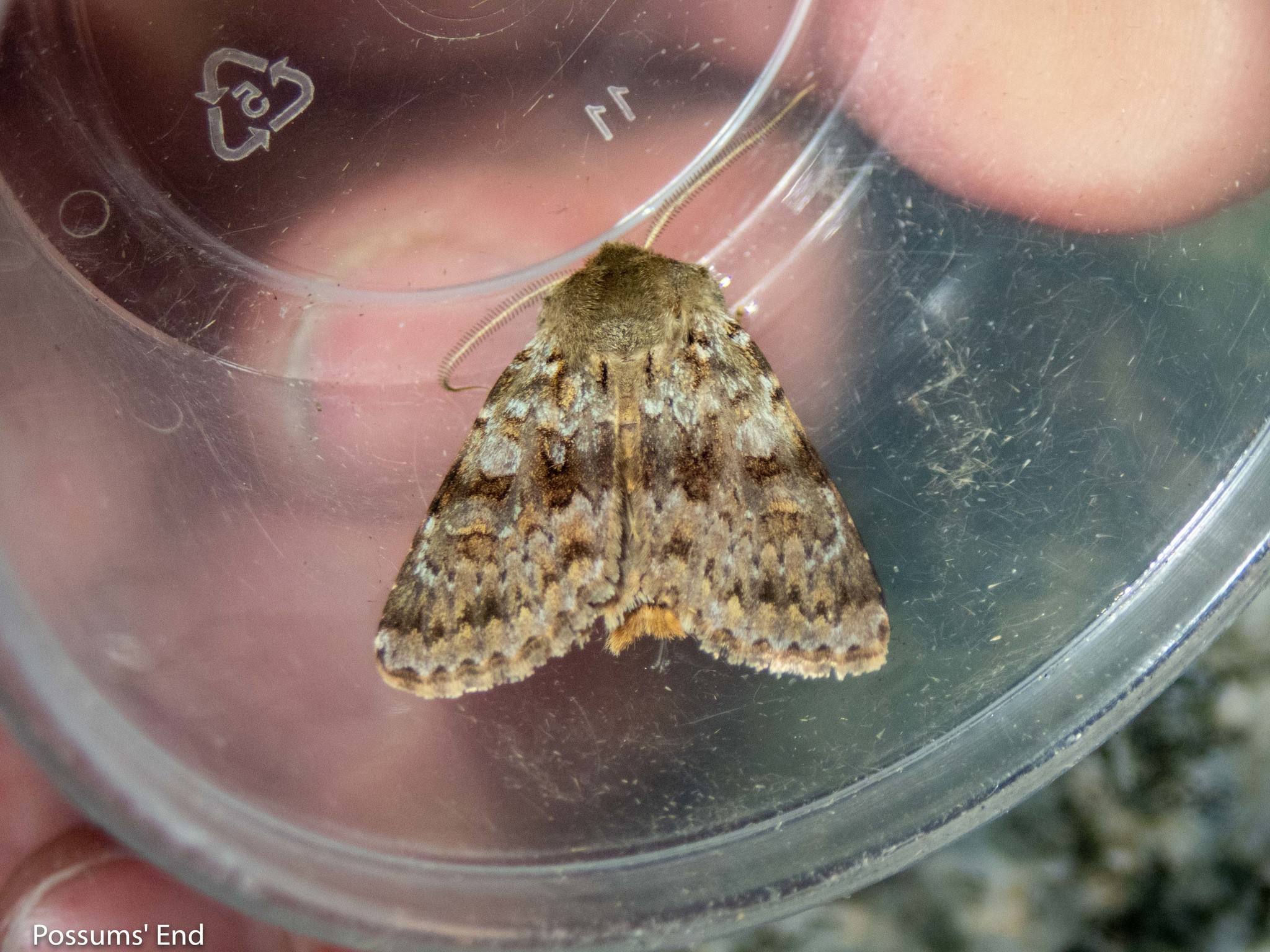
Ichneutica falsidica observed near Mount Gunn, Southland

Meyrick described the species as follows:

♀. 43 mm. Head whitish mixed with grey and blackish. Thorax grey mixed with whitish. Abdomen ochreous-grey-whitish. Forewings rather elongate-triangular, apex obtuse, termen slightly waved, obliquely rounded; fuscous-grey, mostly overlaid with white suffusion; subbasal line cloudy, dark fuscous, not reaching dorsum; first and second lines indistinctly margined with dark-fuscous irroration, first slightly curved, second waved, strongly curved outwards on upper 2/3; median shade of dark-fuscous irroration, bent near costa; orbicular-suboval, whitish, edged laterally with dark fuscous; reniform whitish, lower third fuscous-grey edged with whitish : anterior edge of subterminail line formed by a waved shade of dark-fuscous irroration. Hindwings fuscous.

This species is variable in appearance. I. falsidica is similar in appearance to I. panda but the former usually has dark dashes along the hind-wings. I. panda is normally the smaller of the two species. The wingspan of I. falsidica males is between 37 and 42 mm and between 40 and 44 mm for females.

== Distribution ==
It is endemic to New Zealand. It is found in the North Island but only in the Tararua Range and Mount Taranaki. This species is also found in the South Island but is more common on the west side of that island.

== Habitat ==
In the South Island this species can be common in the alpine zone.

== Behaviour ==
Adults of this species are on the wing from January to March. Adult moths have been seen flying during sunny days. This species is drawn to light.

== Life history and host species ==
The life history of this species is unknown. The host species of the larvae of I. falsidica are unknown.
