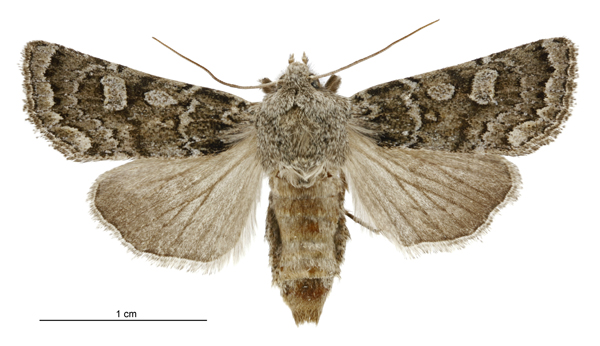
- Female
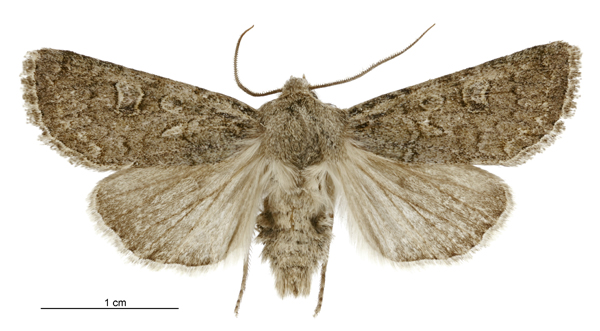
- Male

Scientific classification
- Kingdom: Animalia
- Phylum: Arthropoda
- Clade: Pancrustacea
- Class: Insecta
- Order: Lepidoptera
- Superfamily: Noctuoidea
- Family: Noctuidae
- Genus: Ichneutica
- Species: I. sistens

Binomial name
- Ichneutica sistens (Guenée, 1868)

Synonyms
- Eumichtis sistens Guenée, 1868; Mythimna sistens (Guenée, 1868); Aletia s.l. sistens (Guenée, 1868); Aletia sistens (Guenée, 1868); Graphania sistens (Guenée, 1868); Agrotis mitis Butler, 1877; Graphania mitis (Butler, 1877); Spaelotis inconstans Butler, 1880; Graphania inconstans (Butler, 1880); Aletia inconstans (Butler, 1880); Mythimna inconstans (Butler, 1880); Leucania temenaula Meyrick, 1907; Graphania temenaula (Meyrick, 1907); Leucania pachyscia Meyrick, 1907; Graphania pachyscia (Meyrick, 1907); Aletia munda Philpott, 1917; Aletia gourlayi Philpott, 1921; Graphania gourlayi (Philpott, 1921); Melanchra cyanopetra Meyrick, 1927; Aletia cyanopetra (Meyrick, 1927); Graphania cyanopetra (Meyrick, 1927); Aletia lacustris Meyrick, 1934; Mythimna lacustris (Meyrick, 1934); Aletia mitis (Butler, 1877)

= Ichneutica sistens =

Species of moth

Ichneutica sistens is a moth of the family Noctuidae. This species is endemic to New Zealand. It can be found in the central North Island and throughout the South Island, although it is more common on the eastern side of that latter Island. It is very variable in both colour and size. I. sistens prefers open habitat such as tussock grasslands, dunes and braided rivers. Larval host species include grasses in the family Poaceae and include species in the genera Rytidosperma and Elymus, as well as Poa cita and Agrostis capillaris. Adults are on the wing from January to May and are attracted to light.

== Taxonomy ==
This species was originally described by Achille Guenée in 1868 using specimens collected by Richard William Fereday in the Canterbury region and named Eumichtis sistens. The lectotype specimen is presumed by Robert Hoare to have been collected at Rakaia. The lectotype specimen is held at the Natural History Museum, London.

In 1988, John S. Dugdale, in his catalogue of New Zealand Lepidoptera, placed this species within the Aletia genus. In 2019, Robert Hoare undertook a major review of New Zealand Noctuidae. During this review the genus Ichneutica was greatly expanded and the genus Aletia was subsumed into that genus as a synonym. As a result of this review, this species is now known as Ichneutica sistens. Hoare, while undertaking the review, inspected the type material of several species, originally named Agrotis mitis, Spaelotis inconstans, Aletia munda, Aletia gourlayi, Melanchra cyanopetra and Aletia lacustris. Hoare placed them all within the genus Ichneutica and subsumed them as synonyms of Ichneutica sistens. Hoare justifies this by arguing that although there are differences in size and wing pattern as well as minor variations in the genitalia of the male moths, these variations are in a continuous series.

== Description ==
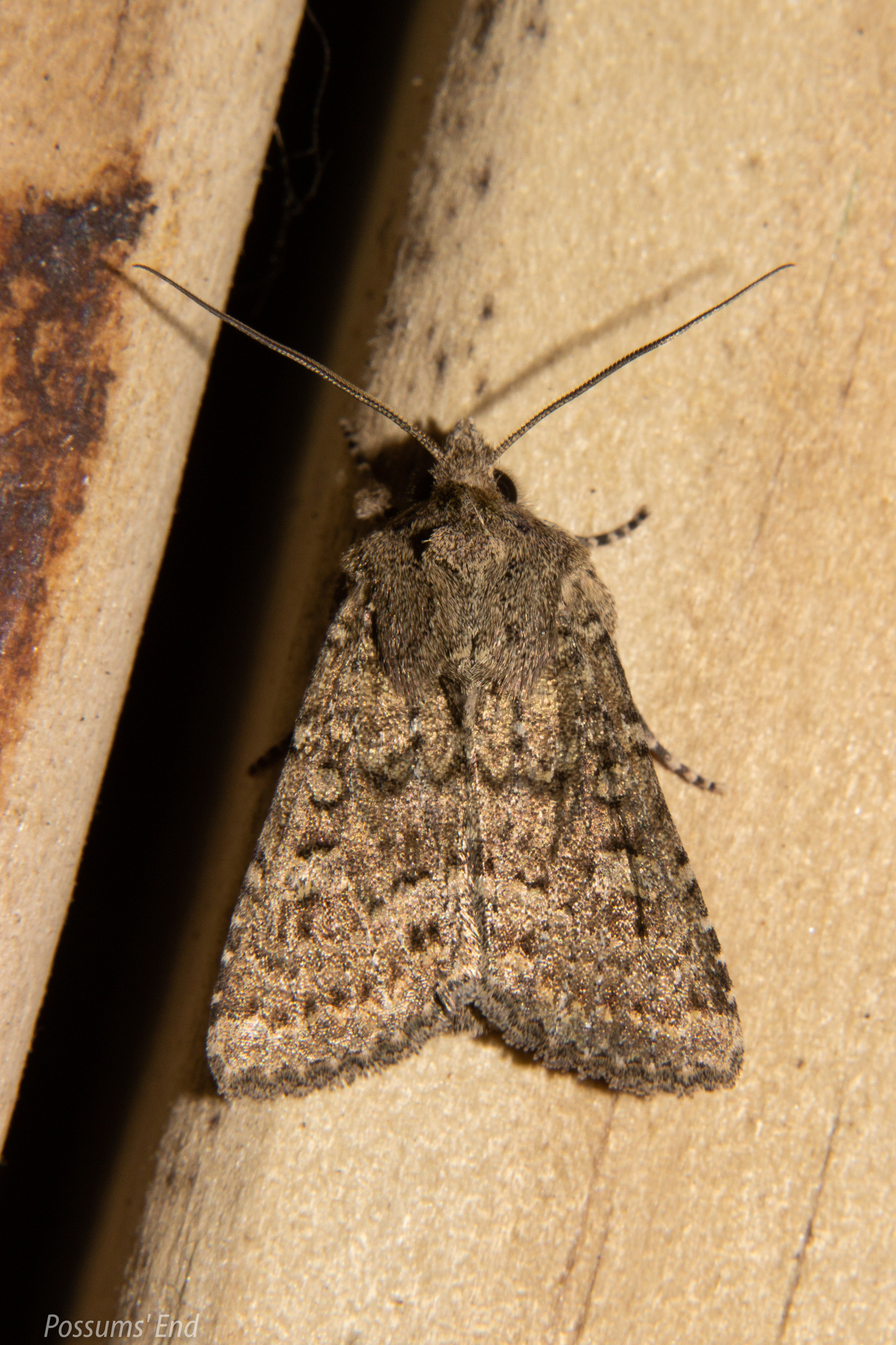
Observation of living Ichneutica sistens

S. Lindsay described the larvae of this species as follows:

25 mm. long, elongate, smooth, ochreous; numerous longitudinal stripes, pale fuscous; sixteen legs.

Guenée describes the adults of this species as follows:

The thorax and superior wings testaceous-grey, with a greenish appearance; all the markings are well defined, especially the elbow line, which is formed of little black lunules slightly separated; the two ordinary spots are large, grey encircled with black; the orbicular is round, marked with a subcostal black dot; the reniform broad, filled in with black below; beneath it is the median shade which forms a series of zig-zags to the inner margin; the subterminal line is slender, pale, sometimes preceded by small isolated black dots; other dots, somewhat lunulate, precede the concolorous fringe : inferior blackish-grey, with terminal black dashes. Collar with a slight black line. Antennae thick, and, with the lens, thickened ciliated denticulations are perceptible. Abdomen without crests. The ♀ is slightly paler; its abdomen very thick, beneath with two lateral series of black markings. The antennae have only slight, scarcely perceptible ciliations.

This species is variable in both size and colour. I. sistens has a forewing that is coloured grey or dark grey or a grey with a greenish tinge. The wingspan of the adult male is between 28 and 39 mm where as the female has a wingspan of between 29 and 39 mm. It can be distinguished from I. virescens as I. sistens is smaller, has a shorter and thicker forewing, with the outer edge being more rounded, and with less of a shine to the colour.

== Distribution ==
I. sistens is endemic to New Zealand. It is found in the central North Island and throughout the South Island, although more frequently on the eastern side of that Island.

== Habitat ==
This species prefers open habitats such as tussock grasslands, dunes and braided rivers.

== Behaviour ==
Adults of I. sistens are on the wing from January to May, though there are some specimens in the New Zealand Arthropod Collection that were collected in Central Otago in September. Adults of this species are attracted to light.

== Life cycle and host species ==
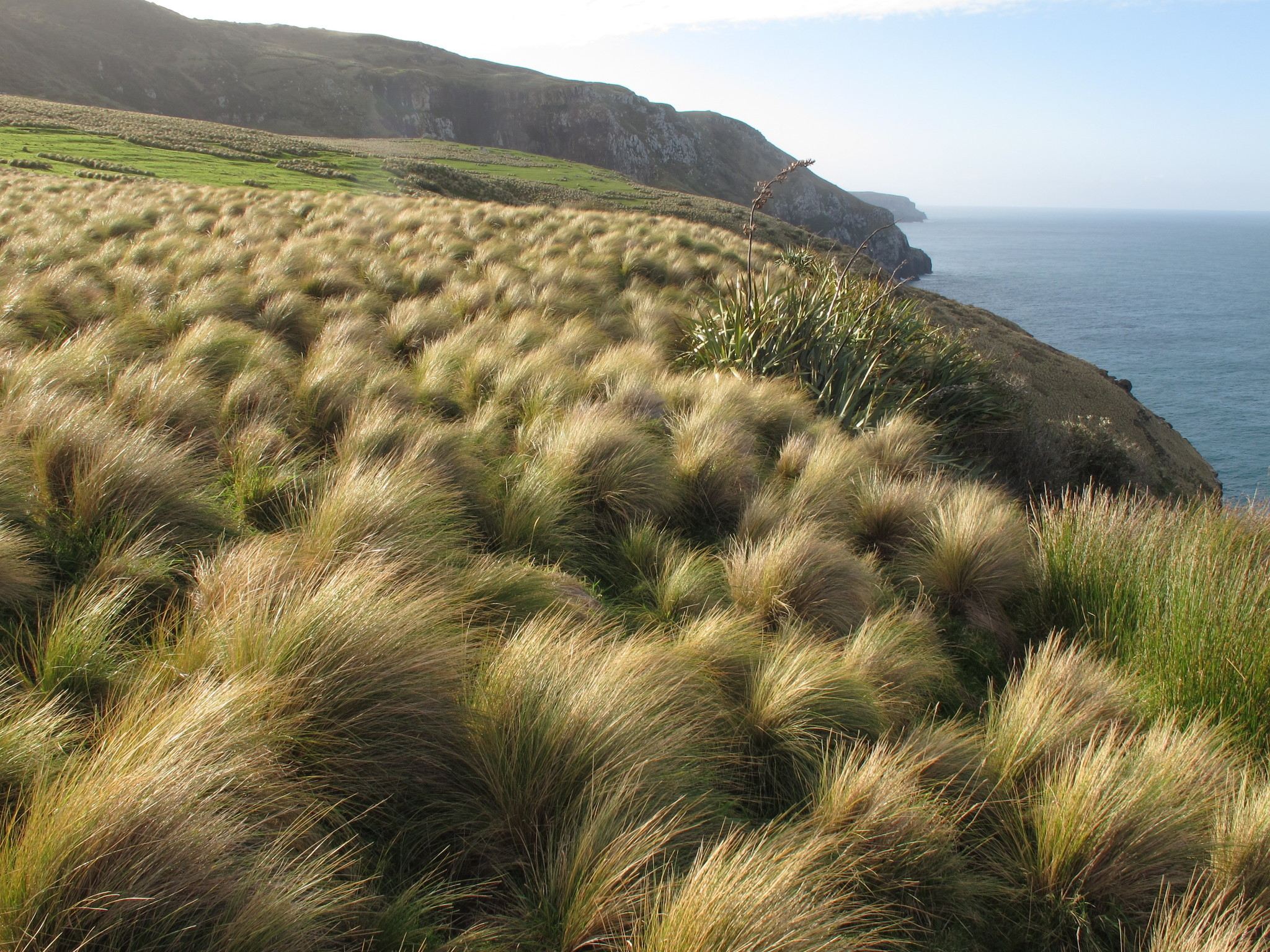
Poa cita on the Otago Peninsula, a host species of I. sistens

The larvae of this species feed on grasses in the family Poaceae including grasses in the genera Rytidosperma and Elymus, and species including Poa cita and Agrostis capillaris. Adults of the species have been observed feeding on Dracophyllum flowers.
