= Mount Earnslaw =

Mountain in South Island, New Zealand

Mount Earnslaw / Pikirakatahi
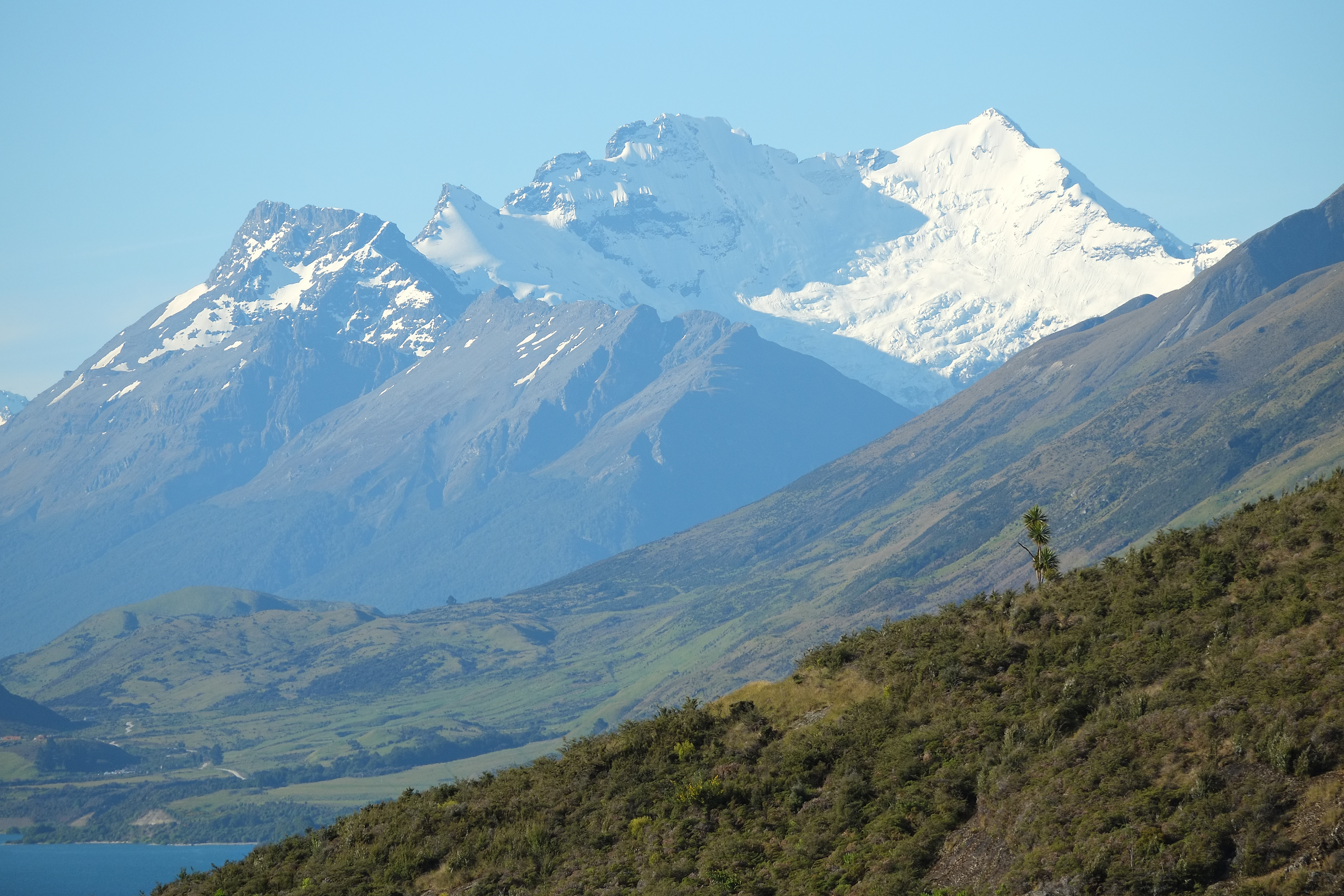
- Mount Earnslaw from Bennetts Bluff lookout

Highest point
- Elevation: 2,819 m (9,249 ft)
- Prominence: 1,359 m (4,459 ft)
- Isolation: 36.3 km (22.6 mi)
- Listing: New Zealand #15
- Coordinates: 44°37′S 168°23′E

Naming
- Native name: Pikirakatahi (Māori)

Geography
- Location within New Zealand
- Location: Otago Region, New Zealand
- Parent range: Forbes Range, Southern Alps

Climbing
- First ascent: Harry Birley 1890.

Mount Earnslaw / Pikirakatahi is a 2,819-metre (9,249 ft) mountain in the South Island of New Zealand. It is named after Earnslaw (formerly Herneslawe) village in the parish of Eccles, Berwickshire, hometown of the surveyor John Turnbull Thomson's father.

Mount Earnslaw is within Mount Aspiring National Park at the southern end of the Forbes Range of the Southern Alps. It is located 25 kilometres north of the settlement of Glenorchy, which lies at the northern end of Lake Wakatipu.

Mount Earnslaw and various other sites in its vicinity feature in the live-action film version of The Lord of the Rings.

== Climbing history ==
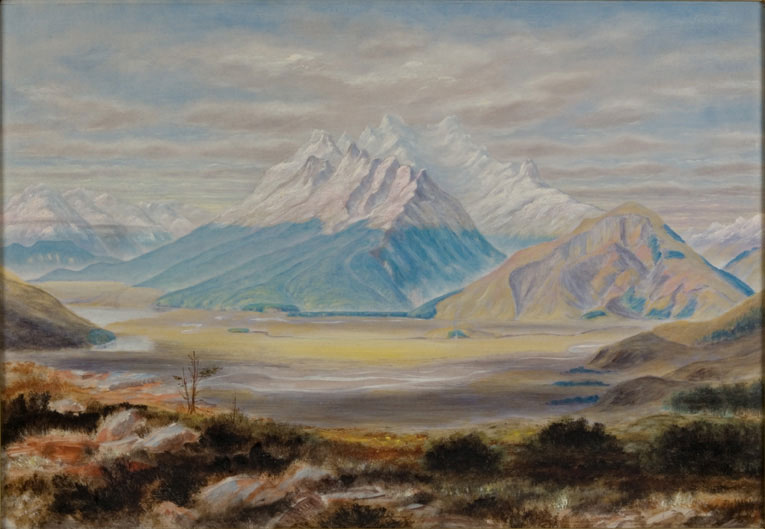
"Mount Earnslaw" by John Turnbull Thomson (1883)

Reverend W.S. Green had come to New Zealand to try to climb Mount Cook. In March 1882, with guides Emil Boss and Ulrich Kaufmann, he attempted Earnslaw, but transport and weather problems forced them to turn back after climbing 5,000 feet (1,500 metres).

After several attempts over a period of years, Glenorchy guide Harry Birley climbed the eastern peak of Earnslaw in 1890. He left a bent shilling in an Irish Moss bottle within a stone cairn, to prove he had reached the top.

The 10 m lower, but much more challenging West Peak, 2.5 km to the west-south-west and separated by a 200 m deep pass, was climbed in 1914 by H.F. Wright and J. Robertson.
