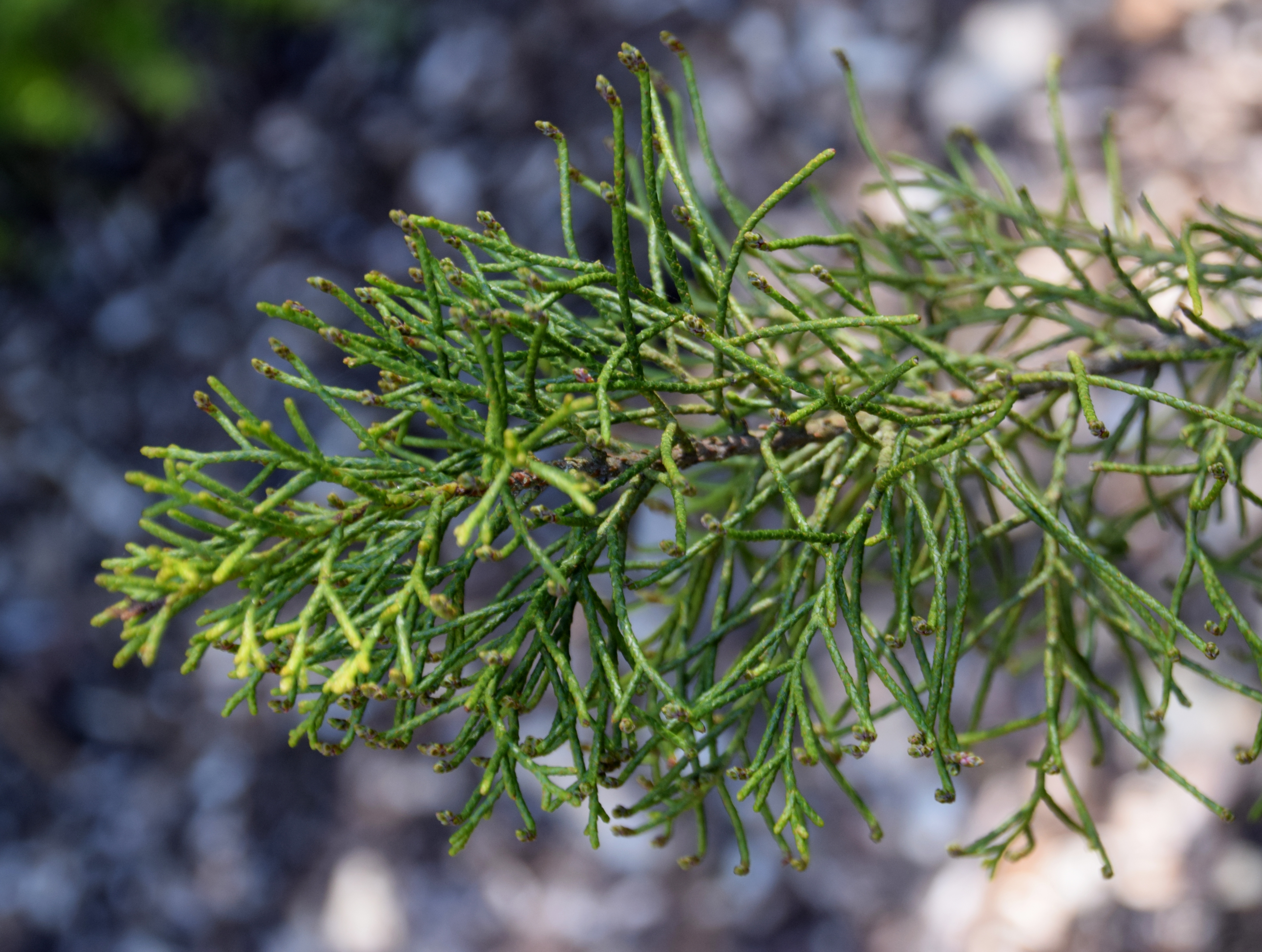

Conservation status
- Least Concern (IUCN 3.1)

Scientific classification
- Kingdom: Plantae
- Clade: Tracheophytes
- Clade: Gymnosperms
- Division: Pinophyta
- Class: Pinopsida
- Order: Araucariales
- Family: Podocarpaceae
- Genus: Halocarpus
- Species: H. biformis

Binomial name
- Halocarpus biformis (Hook.) Quinn

Synonyms
- Dacrydium biforme (Hook.) Pilger; Dacrydium colensoi Kirk; Podocarpus biformis Hook.

= Halocarpus biformis =

Species of conifer

Halocarpus biformis, the yellow pine or pink pine, is a species of dioecious coniferous tree in the family Podocarpaceae, endemic to New Zealand. It yields a tight-grained, sweet-smelling, and extremely durable wood.

== Description ==
Halocarpus biformis is a species of small dioecious tree or shrub that can attain heights of 10 metres (33 feet), but is usually a low-spreading bush in open areas.

It has silvery-grey bark, with a reddish brown inner layer.

== Taxonomy ==
The species was formerly known as Dacrydium biforme.

== Distribution and habitat ==
Halocarpus biformis is found at higher elevations in the volcanic plateau of the North Island and at lower elevations of the South Island and Stewart Island. Usually grows between 600–1,370 m (1,970–4,490 ft) above sea level.

In Fiordland, it grows in damp sites in lowland forest.
