= Wilderness Scientific Reserve =

Scientific reserve in the South Island of New Zealand

- IUCN category Ia (strict nature reserve)
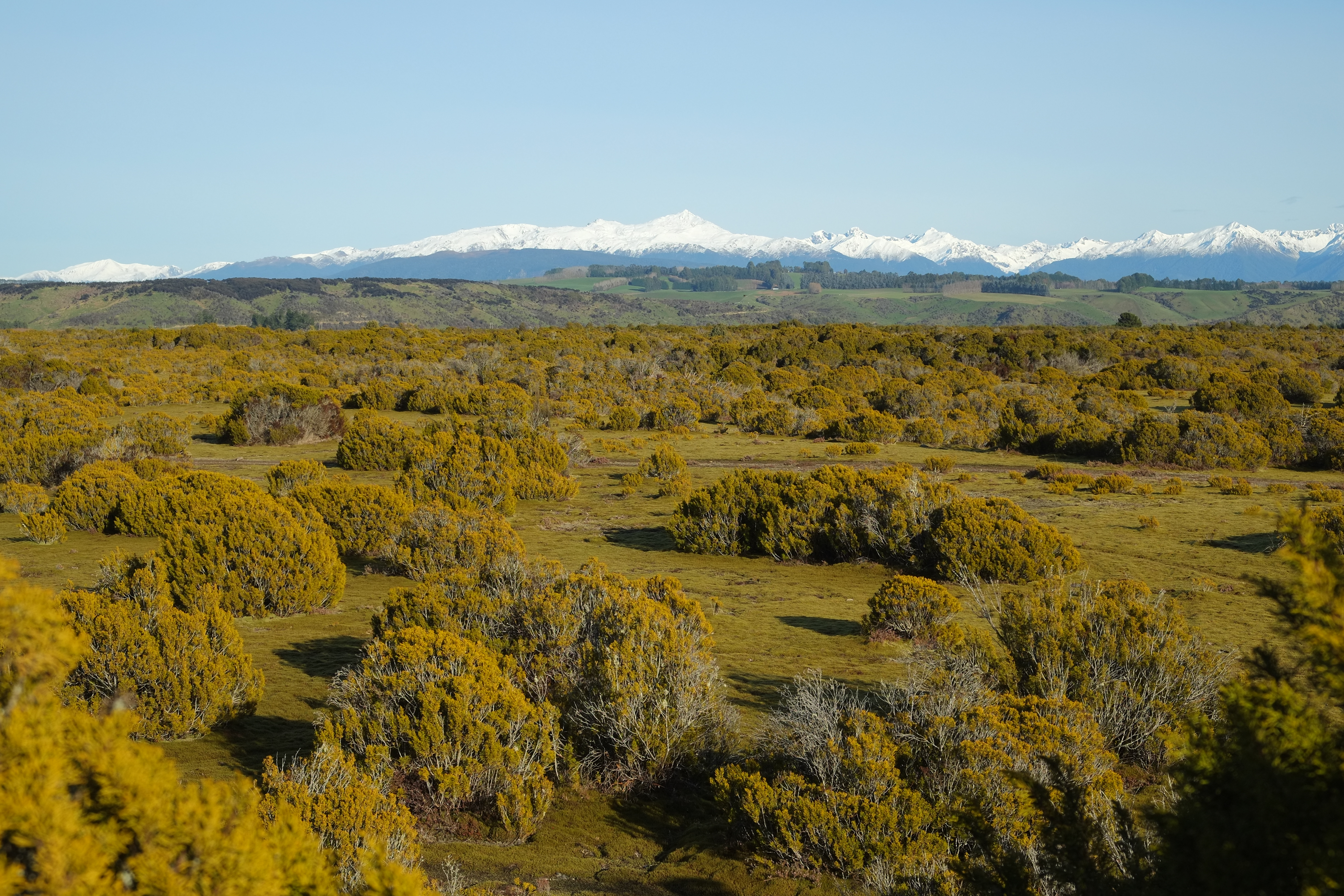
- Wilderness Scientific Reserve, showing Halocarpus bidwillii
- Interactive map of Wilderness Scientific Reserve
- Location: Southland, New Zealand
- Nearest town: Te Anau, New Zealand
- Coordinates: 45.534°S 167.853°E
- Area: 0.88 km^{2} (0.34 sq mi)
- Governing body: Department of Conservation

The Wilderness Scientific Reserve (officially The Wilderness Area Scientific Reserve), is a protected 88 ha (220 acres) scientific reserve located in the Southland Region of New Zealand's South Island. It lies to the north of Mararoa River with portions of the reserve on both the north and south sides of State Highway 94. Established in 1964, the reserve was created to preserve a distinctive post‑glacial vegetation community dominated by the hardy native bog pine (Halocarpus bidwillii), which survives in thin, stony soils characteristic of glacial moraines and riverbeds. There is a short wheelchair-accessible path from the State Highway to a viewing platform over the bog pine forest. In addition to the area protected as a scientific reserve, there is an adjoining area of 42 ha (100 acres) to the west of the reserve that is designated as conservation stewardship land.

Landcare Research describes the bog pine heathland in the Wilderness Scientific Reserve as a critically endangered ecosystem.

== Flora ==
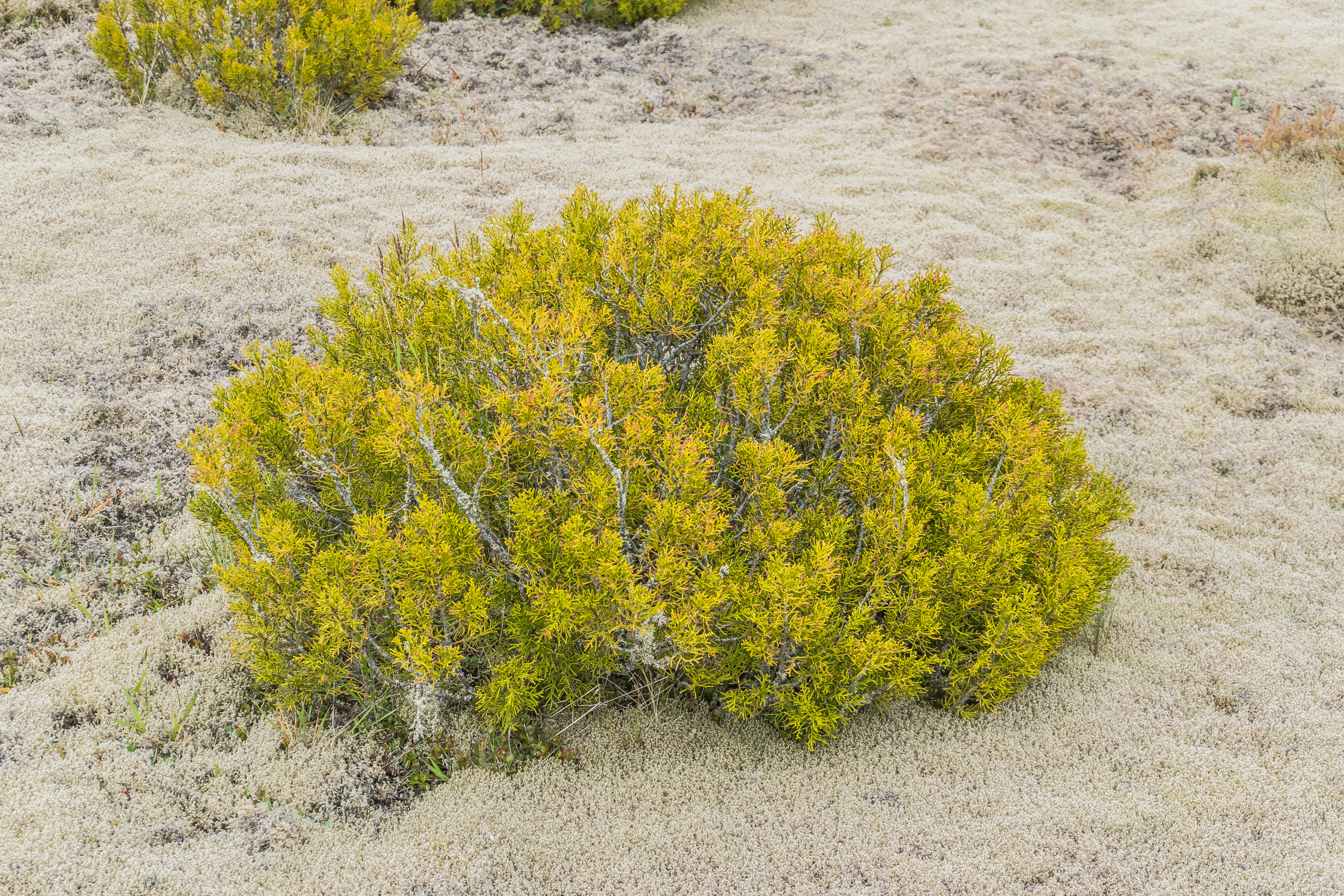
Halocarpus bidwillii in Wilderness Scientific Reserve

The most prominent vegetation in the reserve is the bog pine, Halocarpus bidwillii, a slow-growing evergreen shrub or small tree endemic to New Zealand. Beneath and between clumps of bog pine, the forest floor is characterized by a dense, rich carpet of mosses and lichens. Racomitrium is common here. Flowering plants like Acaena are found in a few areas in the reserve. There are many ferns like the prickly shield fern (Polystichum vestitum) and the bracken fern (Pteridium esculentum). Non-native plants like Douglas fir (Pseudotsuga menziesii) have been grown near the reserve.
