= Mountain tōtara =

Mountain tōtara may refer to:

- Podocarpus laetus, a coniferous tree endemic to New Zealand
- Podocarpus nivalis, a coniferous shrub endemic to New Zealand
