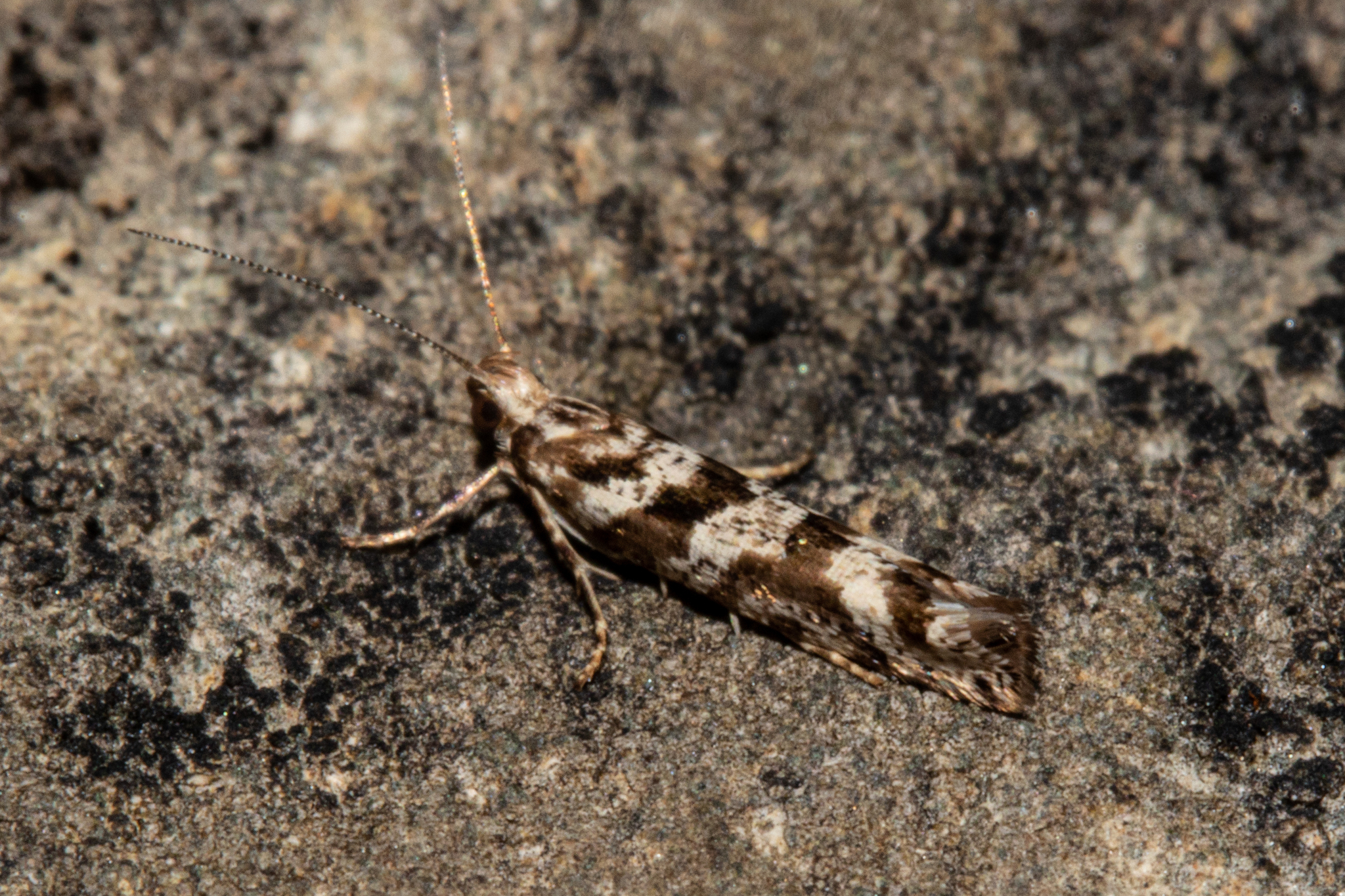

Scientific classification
- Kingdom: Animalia
- Phylum: Arthropoda
- Class: Insecta
- Order: Lepidoptera
- Family: Plutellidae
- Genus: Chrysorthenches
- Species: C. porphyritis

Binomial name
- Chrysorthenches porphyritis (Meyrick, 1885)

Synonyms
- Orthenches porphyritis Meyrick, 1885; Yponomeuta cuprea Meyrick, 1901

= Chrysorthenches porphyritis =

Species of moth endemic to New Zealand

Chrysorthenches porphyritis is a species of moth in the family Plutellidae. It was first described by Edward Meyrick in 1885 and is endemic to New Zealand. This species is found on both the North and South Islands in open native forests and scrubs at altitudes ranging from sea level to 1370 m. The larvae feed on Podocarpus laetus, P. totara, P. nivalis, and Phyllocladus alpinus. The larvae create shelters by loosely spinning together the leaves of their host plants and can be found feeding in groups. The pupa develops inside a thin cocoon. Hudson believed this species had two broods a year. Adult moths are active throughout the year. The adults of this species, particularly the females, exhibit variability in coloration and forewing patterns.

== Taxonomy ==
This species was first described by Edward Meyrick in 1885 and named Orthenches porphyritis. Meyrick provided a more detailed description of the species in 1886. In 1901, under the impression he was describing a new species, Meyrick named this moth Ypononmeuta cuprea. Meyrick synonymized this name in 1923. In 1927 Alfred Philpott, studied the male genitalia of this species. George Hudson discussed and illustrated this species in his 1928 book The butterflies and moths of New Zealand and again discussed the species in his 1939 book A Supplement to the butterflies and moths of New Zealand. In 1996 John S. Dugdale placed this species in the genus Chrysorthenches. The female lectotype, collected in Dunedin in August, is held at the Natural History Museum, London.

== Description ==
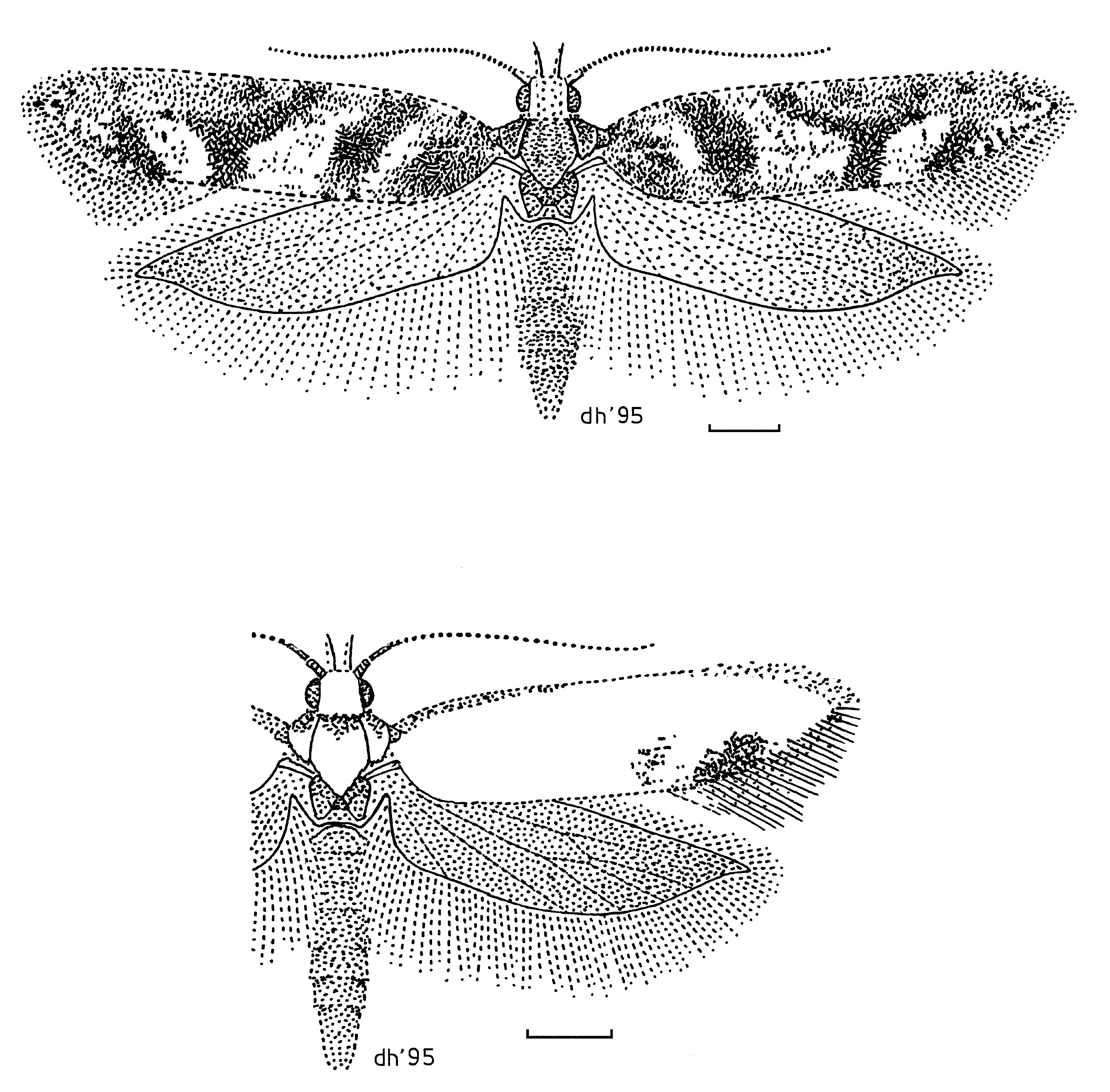
Illustration of C. porphyritis

Meyrick described the larvae of the species as follows:

Larva 16-legged, moderate, cylindrical, rather tapering at both ends; dull light greenish - ochreous; dorsal narrow, ochreous-whitish, bordered on each side by a slender dull reddish-fuscous streak, coalescing towards extremities; head brownish-ochreous

Meyrick described the adults of the species as follows:

Male, female. — 11-14 mm. Head light ochreous. Palpi long, light ochreous or whitish, externally suffused with dark fuscous, terminal joint twice as long as second. Antennae whitish, annulated with dark fuscous. Thorax ochreous, mixed and suffused with purplish and dark fuscous. Abdomen grey. Legs dark fuscous, apex of joints and posterior tibiae whitish. Forewings elongate, narrow, costa arched, apex acute, hind-margin very obliquely sinuate; brownish-ochreous, with purple or coppery reflections, sometimes mixed with grey-whitish; an irregular irroration of small dark fuscous spots; markings suffused, deep bronzy or violet-fuscous, very variable; normally a fascia-like rather oblique streak from costa at 1/4, usually abbreviated, but sometimes reaching inner margin, an irregular median fascia parallel to this, connected by a bar with costa at 3/4, and a narrow fascia from costa before apex to anal angle, but these are sometimes incomplete or partially suffused; in one specimen, traces of a longitudinal white median streak: cilia brownish-ochreous, with a dark fuscous spot at apex. Hind- wing ovate-lanceolate, apex acute, hindmargin sinuate; grey, towards apex darker; cilia grey.

This species, particularly the females, exhibits extreme variability in coloration and forewing markings.

== Distribution ==
This species is endemic to New Zealand and have been collected throughout the North and South Islands. The adult moths have been collected at altitudes from sea level up to 1370 m.

== Behaviour ==
The larvae feed from a structure created by loosely spinning together the leaves of their host plant. They are often found feeding in groups. When pupating the insect forms a pupa inside a thin cocoon. Hudson was of the opinion that this species had two broods during each year with adults being on the wing more commonly in September and again in March. However this moth has been collected all year round.

== Habitat and host species ==
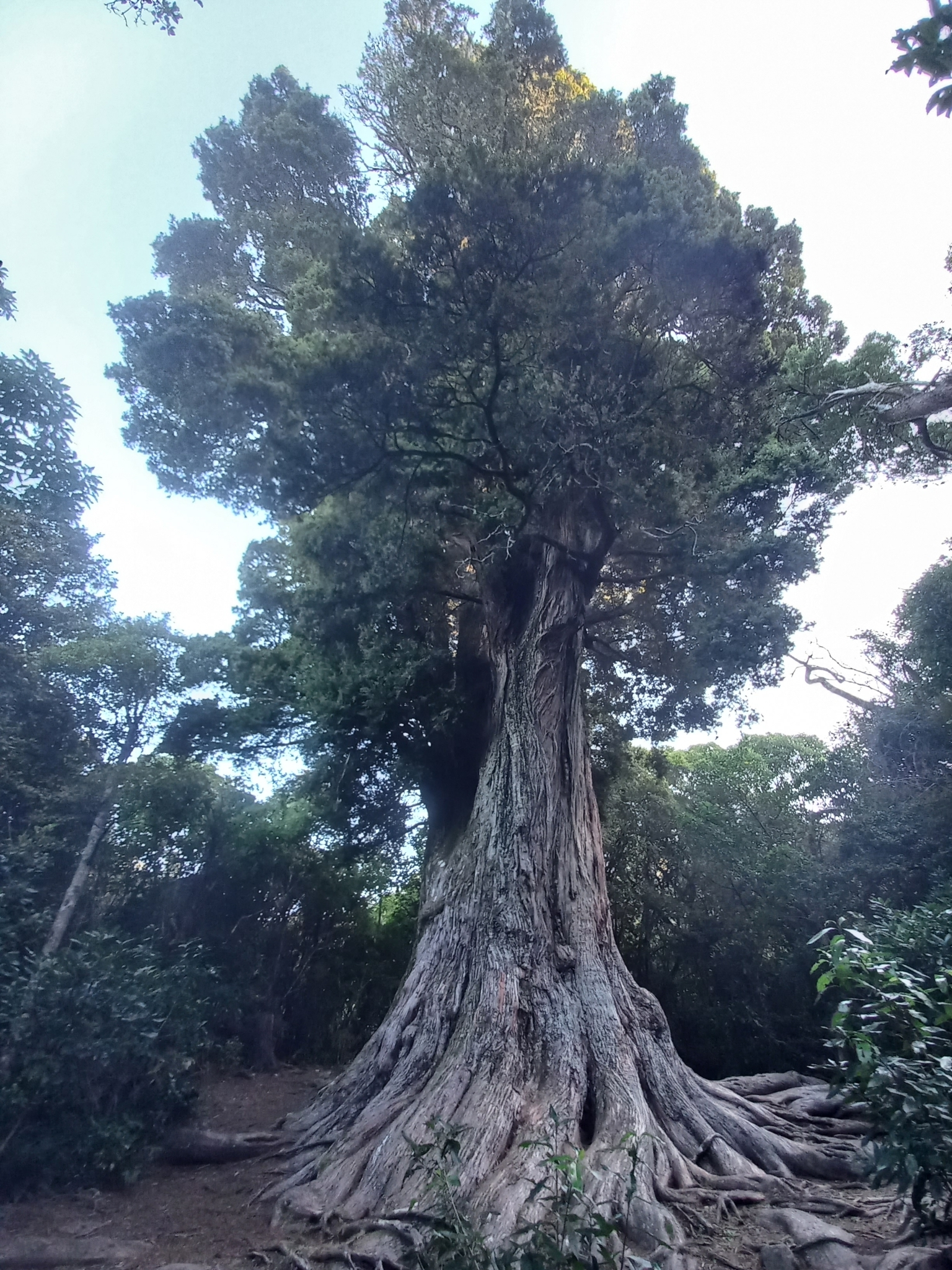
A larval host, P. totara.

The species prefers to inhabit open native forest and scrub. The larval hosts of C. porphyritis are Podocarpus laetus, P. totara, P. nivalis, and Phyllocladus alpinus. The larvae are normally found feeding on P. alpinus where there are nearby Podocarpus species.

== DNA analysis ==
In 2020 this species along with the other species in the genus Chrysorthenches had their morphological characters studied.

== Gallery ==
Illustrations of variations of this moth.
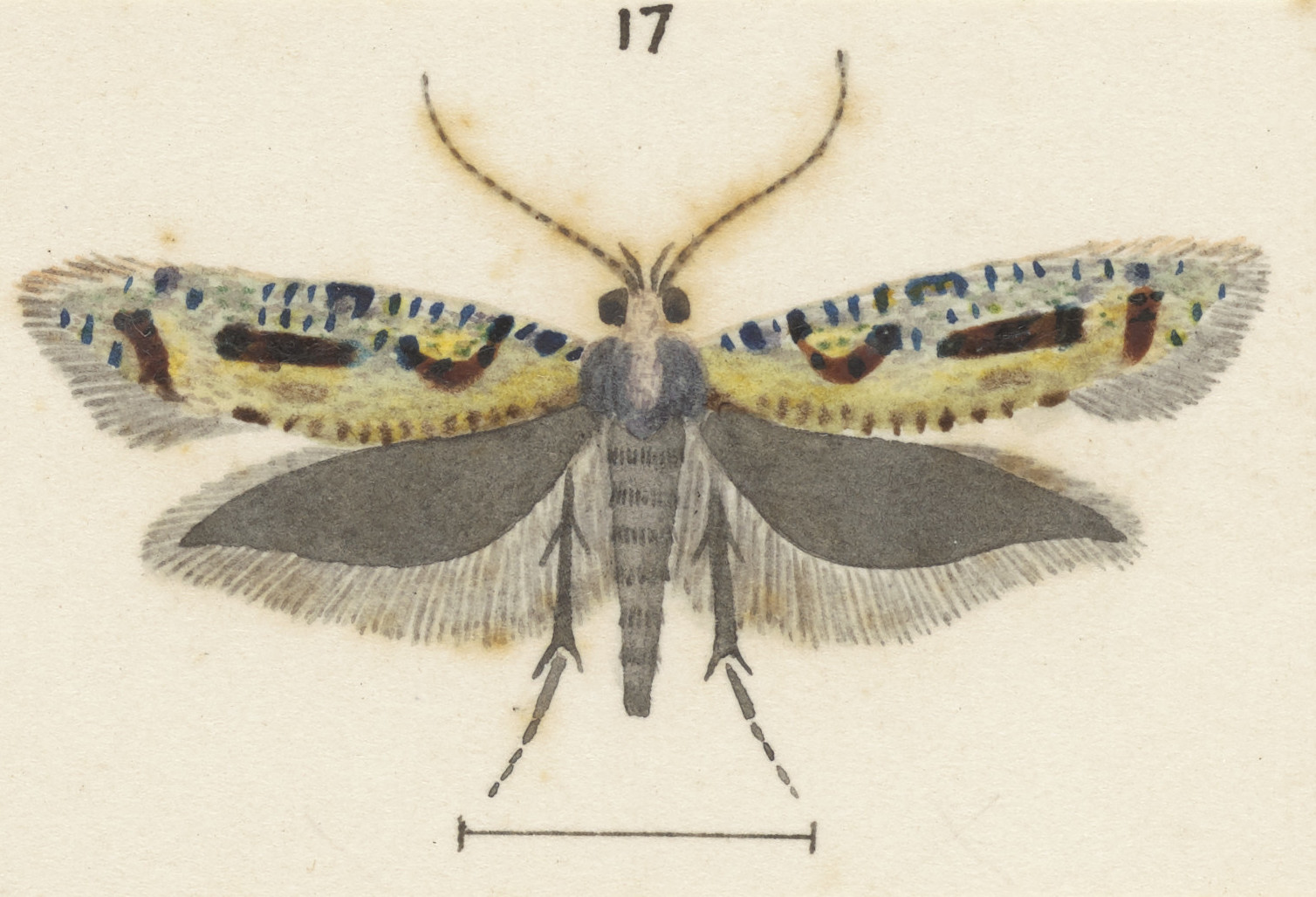

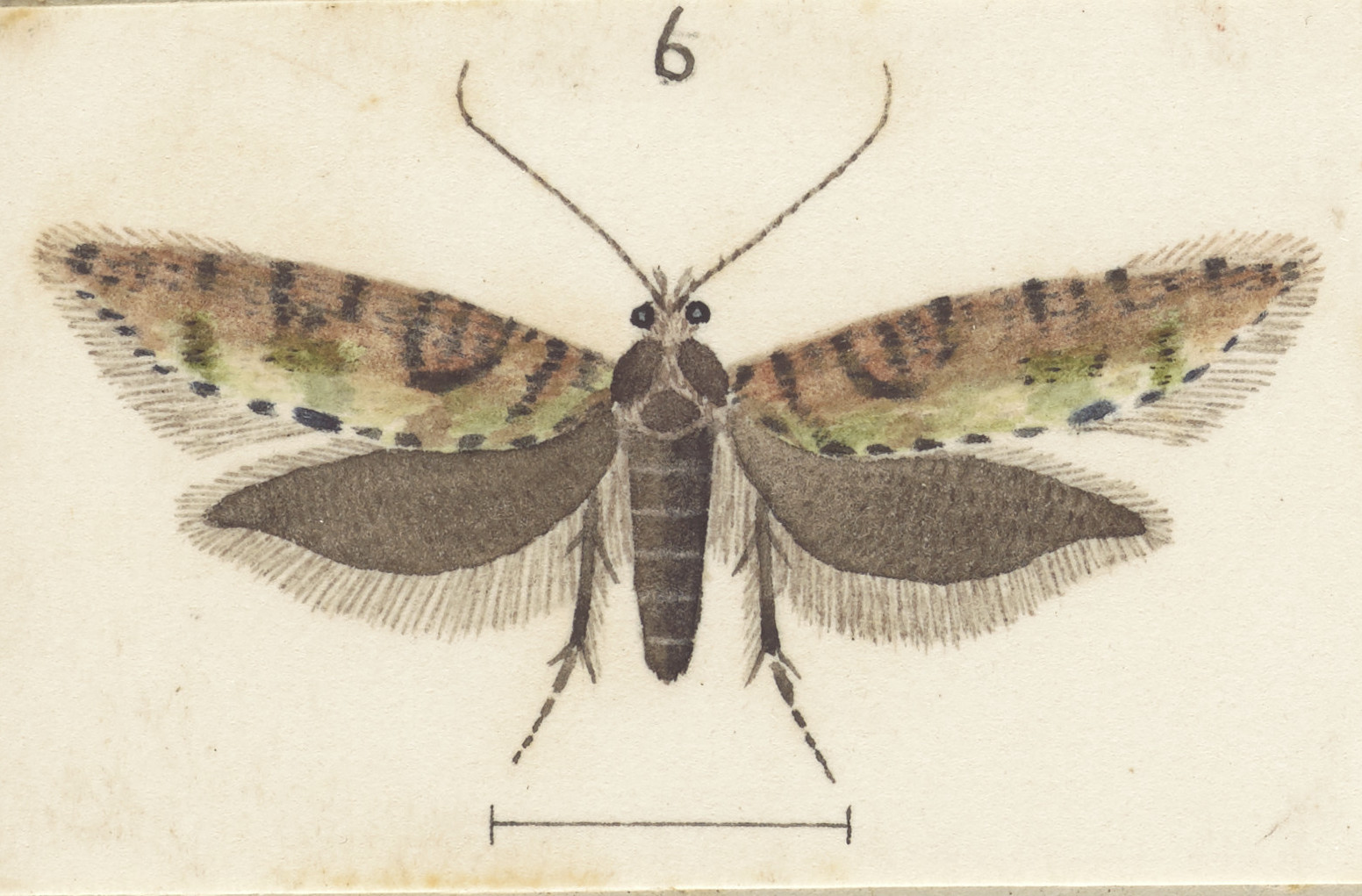

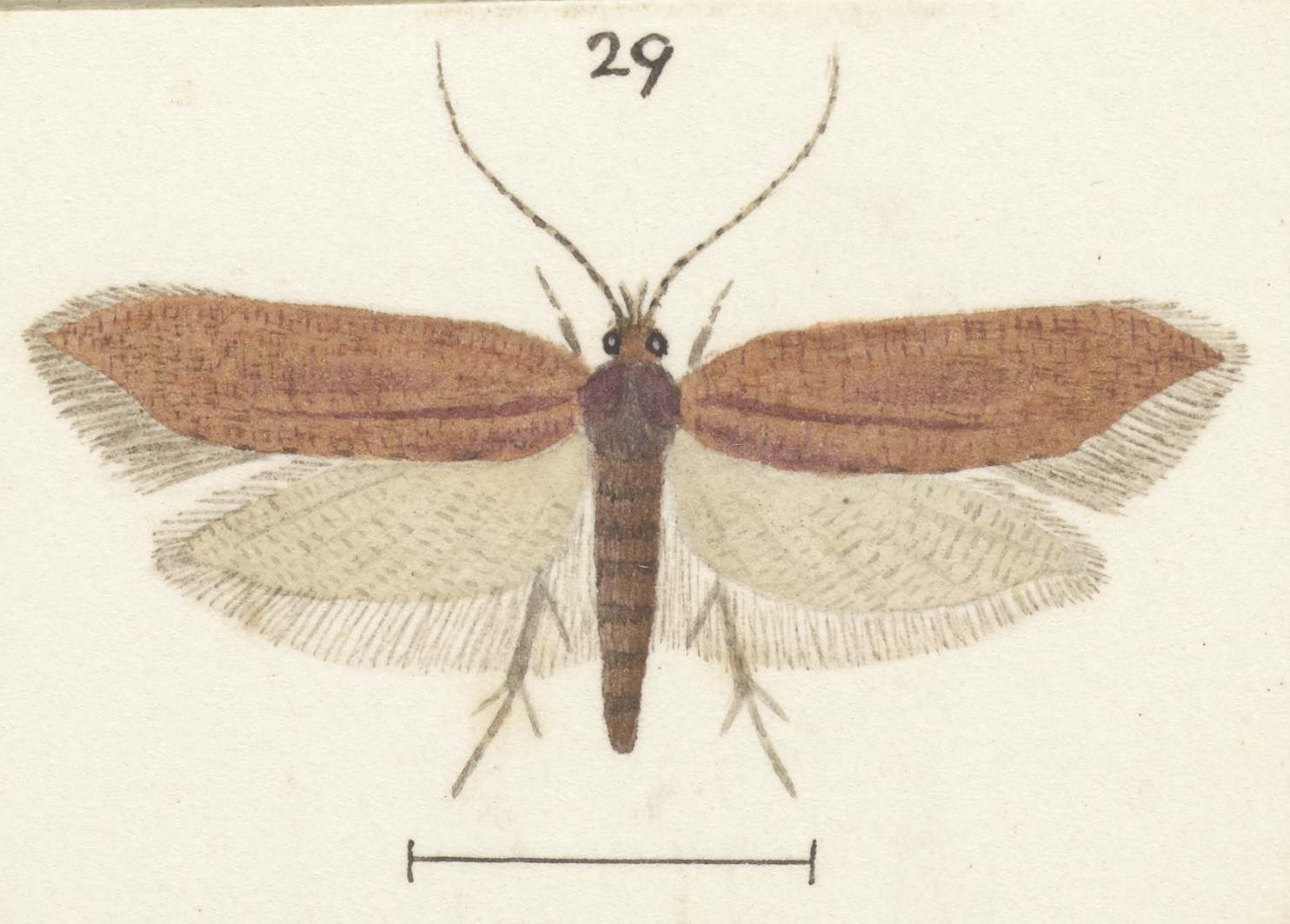
