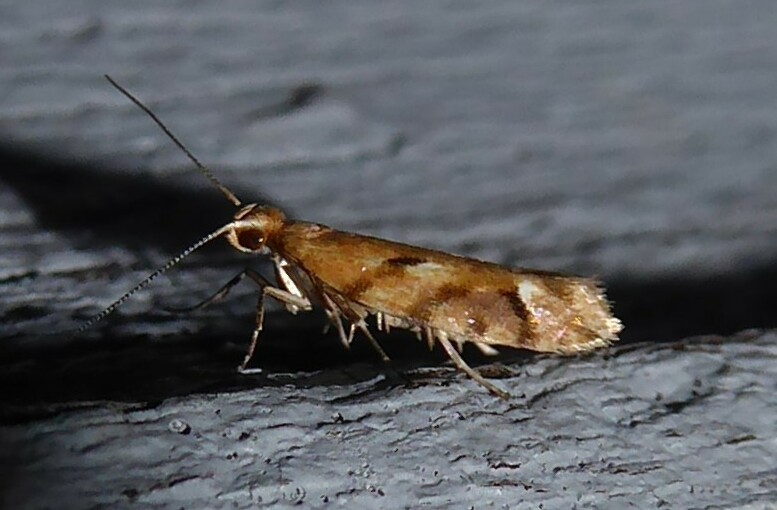

Scientific classification
- Kingdom: Animalia
- Phylum: Arthropoda
- Class: Insecta
- Order: Lepidoptera
- Family: Plutellidae
- Genus: Chrysorthenches
- Species: C. virgata

Binomial name
- Chrysorthenches virgata (Philpott, 1920)

Synonyms
- Orthenches virgata Philpott, 1920

= Chrysorthenches virgata =

Species of moth endemic to New Zealand

Chrysorthenches virgata is a species of moth in the family Plutellidae. It was first described by Alfred Philpott in 1920. It is endemic to New Zealand and has been found in the North, South and Chatham Islands at altitudes ranging from sea-level up to approximately 1000 m. This species inhabits areas where its larval host plants, Libocedrus bidwillii and Cupressus macrocarpa are common. The larvae feed on the leaves of their hosts from under a silk shelter and pupate in a cocoon of thick silk covered in frass. Adult moths are on the wing from September to February as well as in April and June.

== Taxonomy ==
This species was first described by Alfred Philpott in 1920 and named Orthenches virgata. George Hudson discussed and illustrated this species in his 1928 book The butterflies and moths of New Zealand and again discussed the species in his 1939 book A Supplement to the butterflies and moths of New Zealand. In 1996 John S. Dugdale placed this species in the genus Chrysorthenches. The female lectotype, collected in Auckland by Alfred Jefferis Turner, is held at the New Zealand Arthropod Collection.

== Description ==
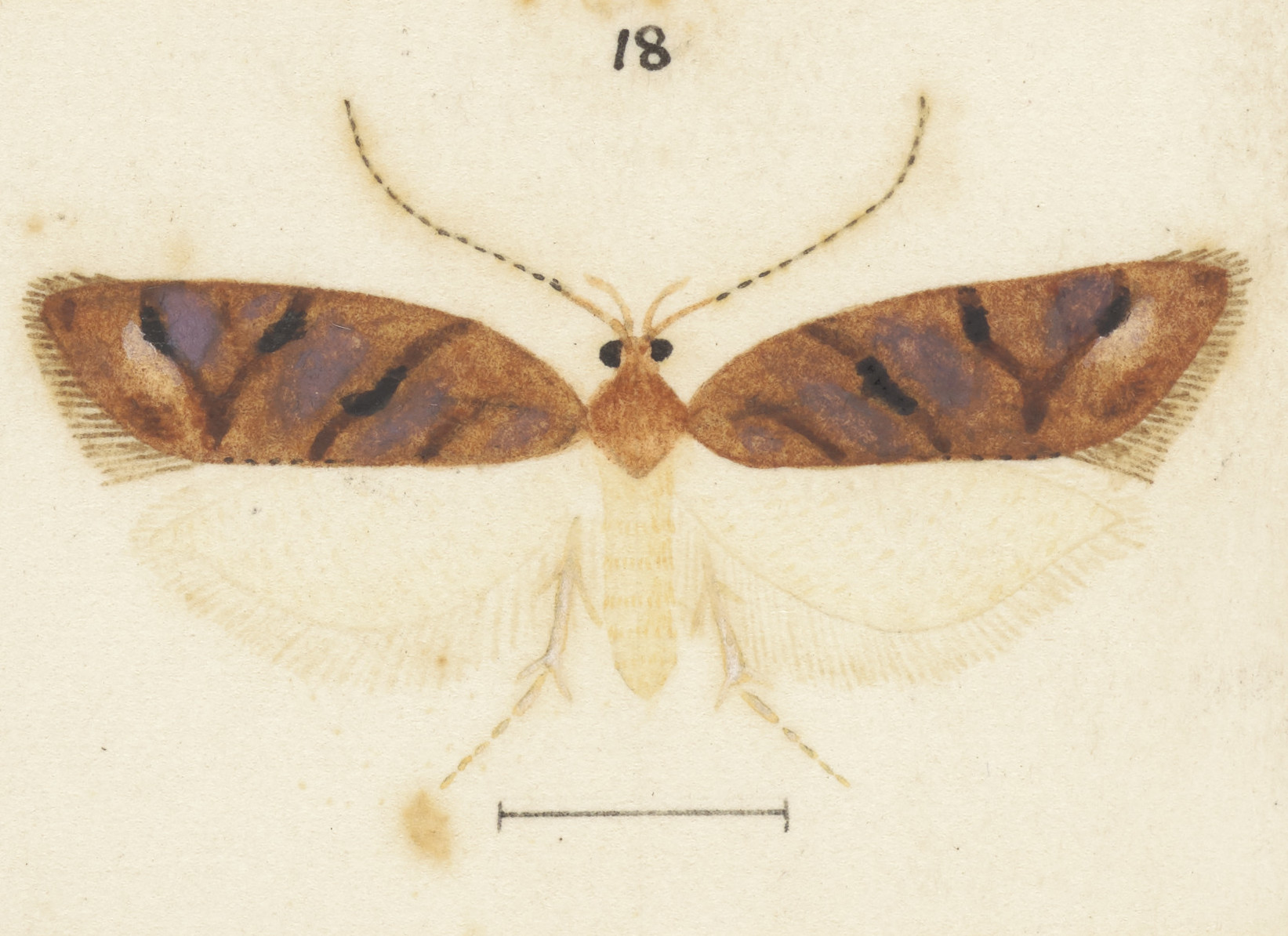
Illustration of female by Hudson.

Dugdale described the larvae of this species as follows:

Final instars with body green, head and pronotum sclerotised, brown. Penultimate abdominal segment with setae LI, L2, L3 on large greyish pinacula.

Philpott described the adult female of this species as follows:

♀. 10 mm. Head, palpi, and thorax ochreous. Antennae ochreous on basal fifth, annulated with white and black on remaining portion. Abdomen greyish-white. Legs, anterior pairs fuscous, tarsi obscurely annulated with ochreous, posterior pair ochreous-whitish. Forewings moderate, costa strongly arched, apex round-pointed, termen moderately oblique; bright ochreous with violet and purplish reflections; a brownish fascia from beneath costa near base to dorsum at 1/4; a well-defined fascia from costa at 1/4 to dorsum at 1/2, slightly irregular, brownish mixed with black; a similar fascia from costa at 2/5, strongly angled above middle towards termen, thence to dorsum at 2/3, where it coalesces with inwardly-oblique fascia from costa at 3/4, both these fasciae having black patches at middle; a white patch margining last fascia at middle; a few black scales on central portion of dorsum : cilia ochreous, becoming fuscous round apex. Hindwings and cilia shining white.

The larvae can be distinguished from the similar looking larvae of C. argentea as C. virgata larvae lack the zigzag colour pattern. The adult moths can be distinguished from their New Zealand sister species as they have a bright ginger colouration of their forewings.

== Distribution ==
This species is endemic to New Zealand and has been found in the North, South and Chatham Islands. It can be found at altitudes ranging from sea level to approximately 1050 m, the upper altitudinal limit of its host species Libocedrus bidwillii.

== Behaviour ==
The larvae of this species feeds on the leaves of its host under a silk shelter. It pupates within a cocoon of thickly woven silk covered in frass. Adults have been observed from September to February as well as in April and June.

== Host species ==
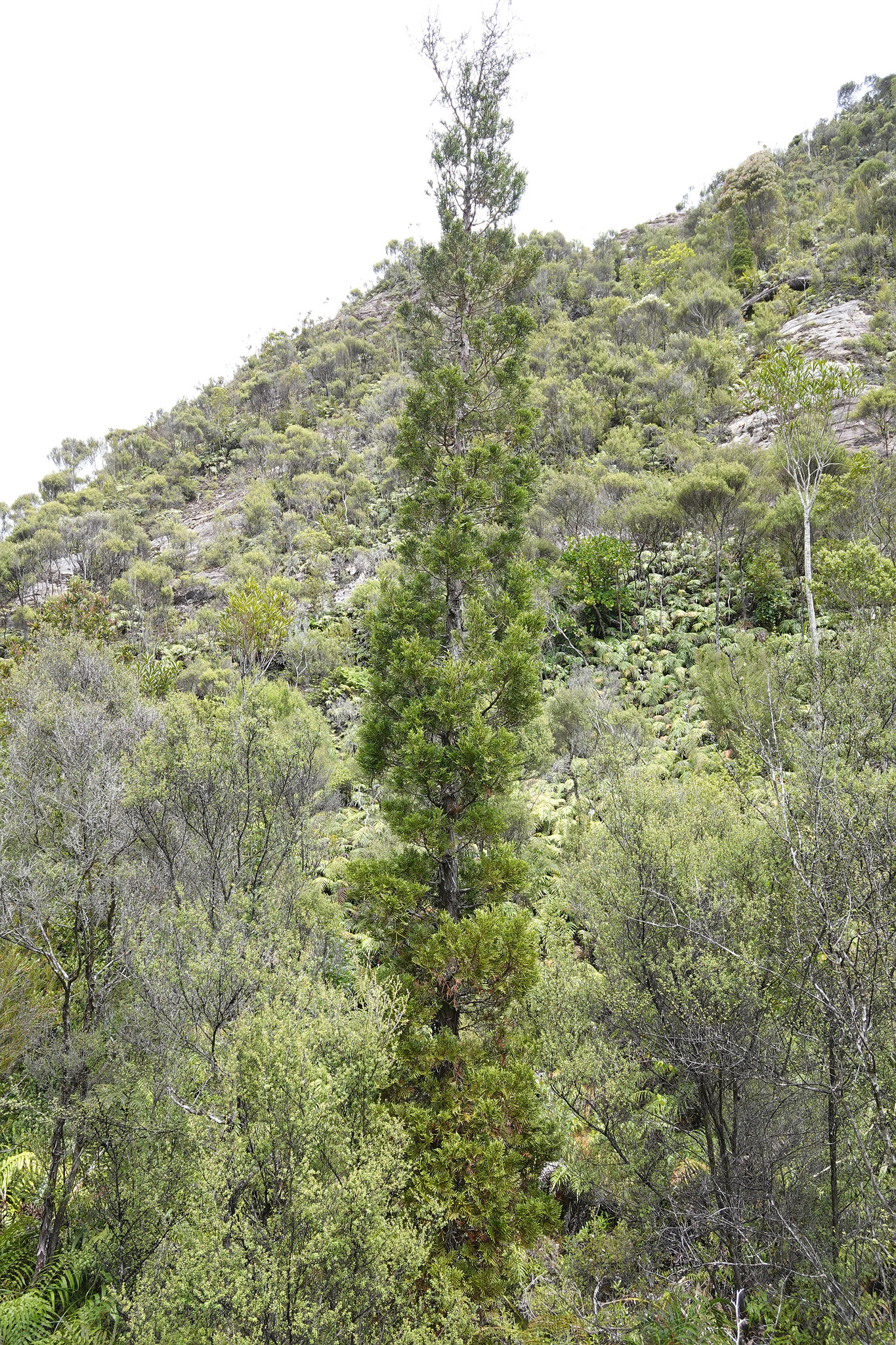
Larval host Libocedrus bidwillii.

The larval host species of C. virgata are Libocedrus bidwillii and Cupressus macrocarpa.

== DNA analysis ==
In 2020 this species along with the other species in the genus Chrysorthenches had their DNA and morphological characters studied.
