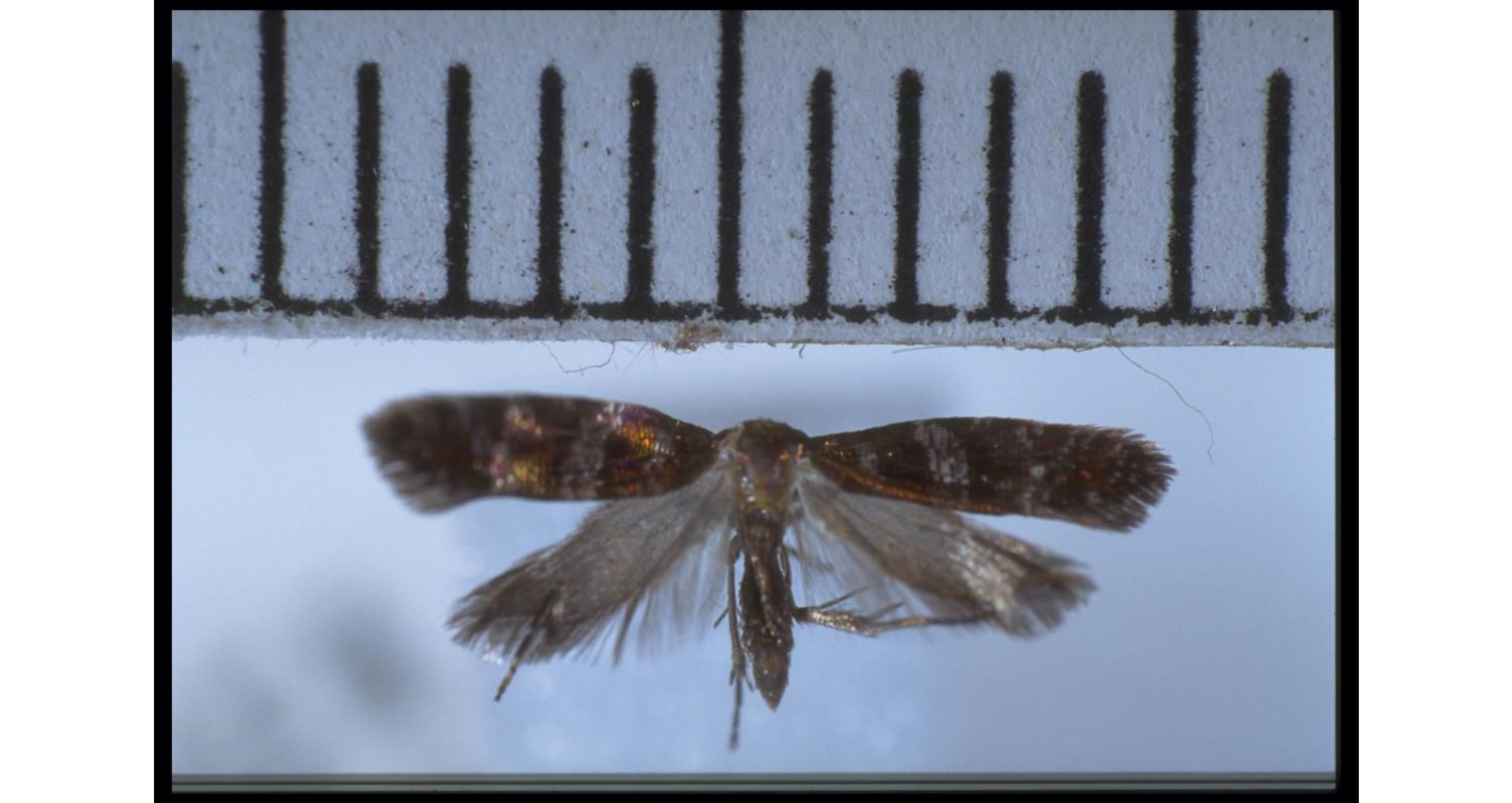
- Holotype

Scientific classification
- Kingdom: Animalia
- Phylum: Arthropoda
- Class: Insecta
- Order: Lepidoptera
- Family: Plutellidae
- Genus: Chrysorthenches
- Species: C. halocarpi

Binomial name
- Chrysorthenches halocarpi Dugdale, 1996

= Chrysorthenches halocarpi =

Species of moth endemic to New Zealand

Chrysorthenches halocarpi is a species of moth in the family Plutellidae. It was first described by John S. Dugdale in 1996. It is endemic to New Zealand and has been observed in the North and South Islands. The species inhabits native bush. Larvae have been collected in October and November. The larval hosts are Halocarpus bidwillii and H. biformis. Adults have been observed on the wing from November to February.

== Taxonomy ==
This species was first described by John S. Dugdale in 1996. The male holotype specimen, collected as a larva at the Lewis Pass summit and raised to maturity, is held at the New Zealand Arthropod Collection.

== Description ==
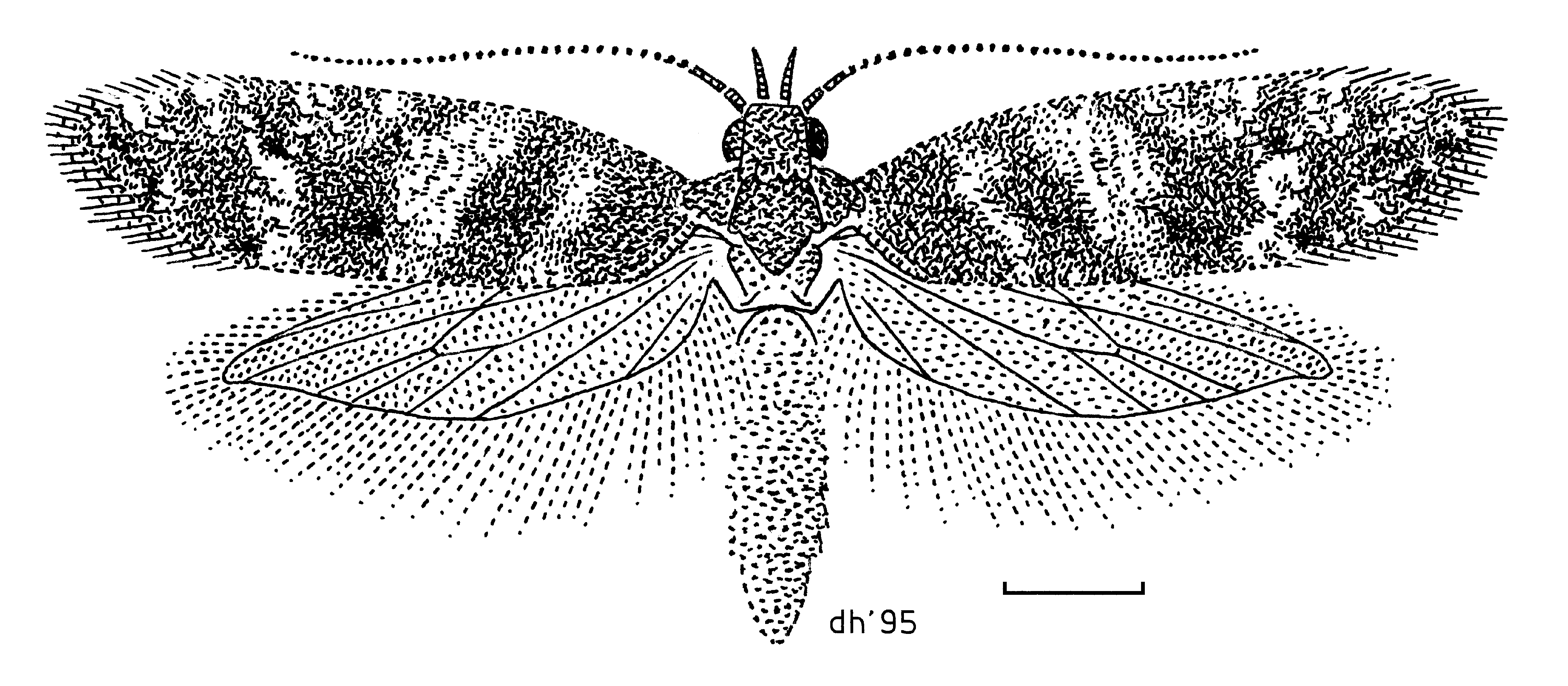
Illustration of C. halocarpi.

The larva of this species has a green body and brown head. The pupa can be found within a silk cocoon covered in frass. Dugdale described the adults of this species as follows:

Wing span 8.5—10.5 mm. Colour pattern: head dark-scaled, with frons and vertex purple-reflecting; antennal scape dark-scaled, pedicel and proximal 4 flagellomeres black dorsally, other flagellomeres black and white-scaled; gular tuft grey. Mesothorax and forewings dark brown, strongly purple-reflecting. Forewings banded with speckled white markings: basal band oblique, not reaching costa in ♂, reaching costa and wider and less peppered (more obvious) in ♀; antemedian band parallel to basal band, with dull purple speckling, and edged irregularly in dark, strongly purple reflecting scales; postmedian band interrupted by dark purple scales discally; vein CuP with strong purple-reflecting patches at half length and at apex (just before tornus); terminal part of wing with irregular small patches of white scales. Thoracic scaling, hindwings and abdomen dark grey. Middle tibia dark, with white rings absent or faint.

Specimens of this species has been confused with specimens of C. drosochalca, but can be distinguished as C. halocarpi has a purple shaded ground colour to its forewings, has dark throat scales in comparison to the white in C. drosochalca and lacks the white rings on the middle tibia which can be seen in C. drosochalca.

== Distribution ==
This species is endemic to New Zealand and has been observed in the North and South Island.

== Behaviour ==
Larvae have been collected in October and November. Adults have been observed on the wing from November to February.

== Hosts ==
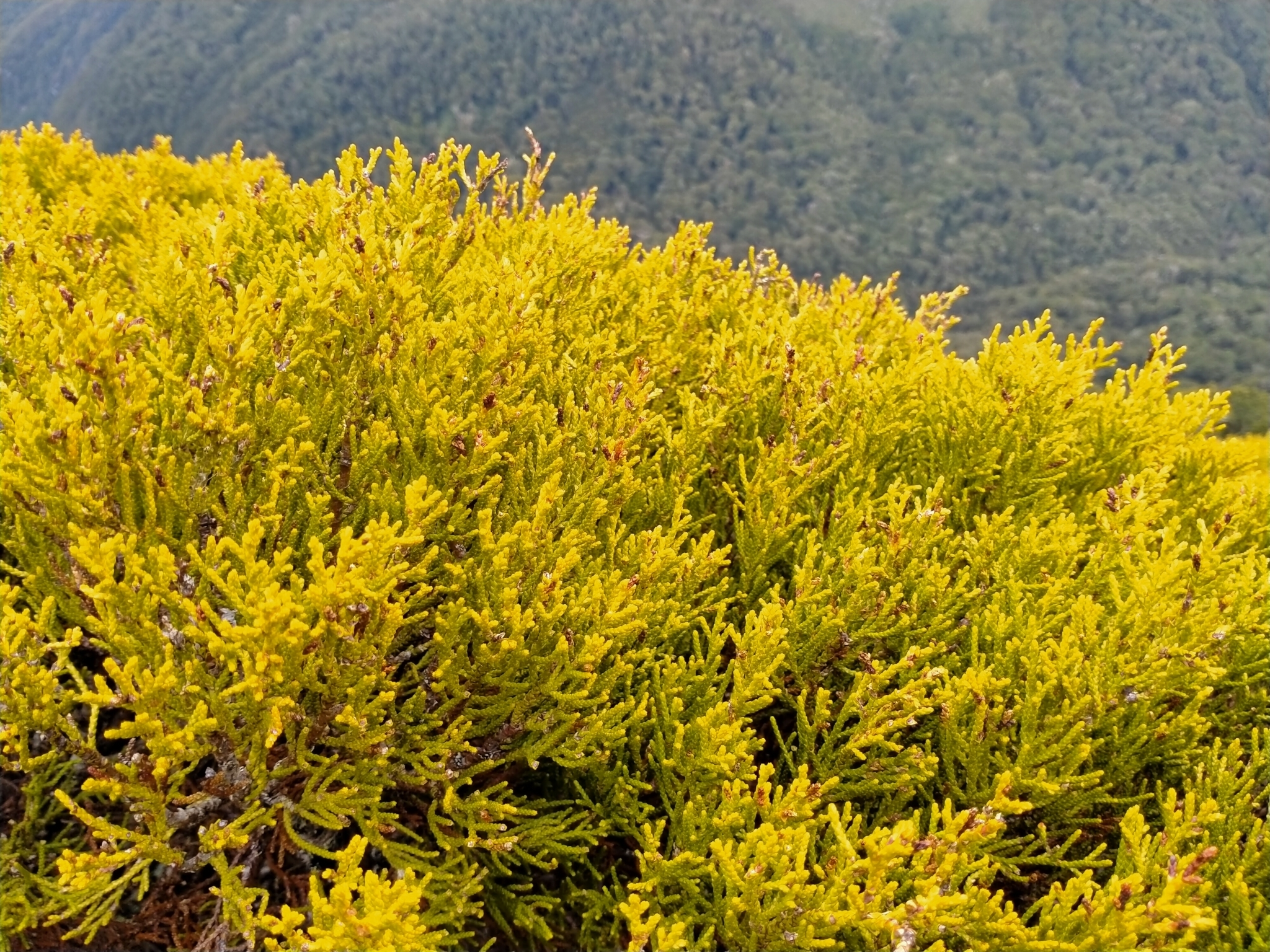
Larval host, H. bidwillii.

The larval hosts of this species are Halocarpus bidwillii and H. biformis.

== DNA analysis ==
In 2020 this species along with the other species in the genus Chrysorthenches had their DNA and morphological characters studied.
