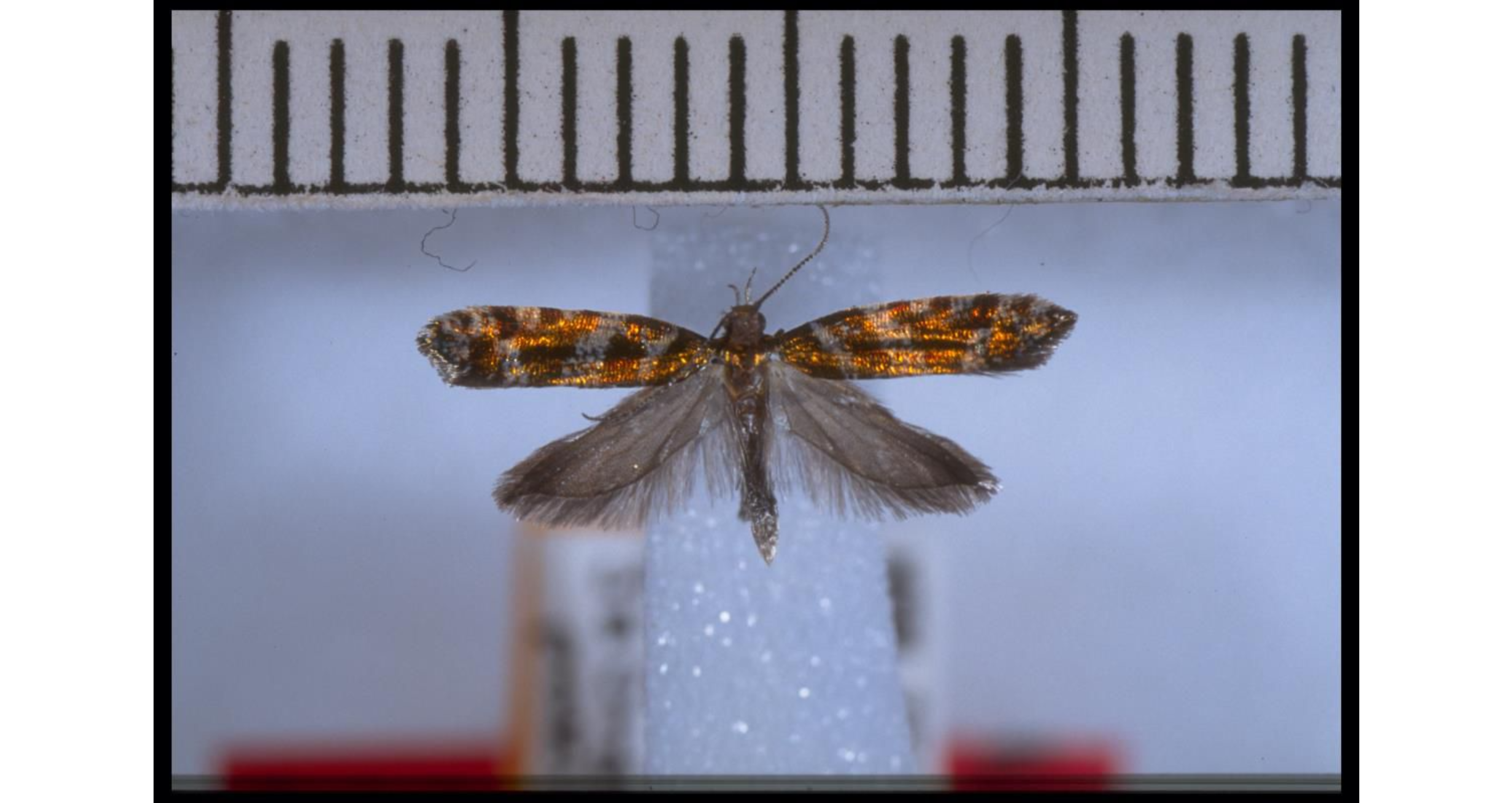
- Male holotype

Scientific classification
- Kingdom: Animalia
- Phylum: Arthropoda
- Class: Insecta
- Order: Lepidoptera
- Family: Plutellidae
- Genus: Chrysorthenches
- Species: C. argentea

Binomial name
- Chrysorthenches argentea Dugdale, 1996

= Chrysorthenches argentea =

Species of moth endemic to New Zealand

Chrysorthenches argentea is a species of moth in the family Plutellidae. It was described by John S. Dugdale in 1996. It is endemic to New Zealand and has been observed in the Buller District and in the West Coast. The larval host is Manoao colensoi. Adults are on the wing in December.

== Taxonomy ==
This species was first described in 1996 by John S. Dugdale using specimens reared from larvae collected on Manoao colensoi and obtained at Giles Creek at the headwaters of Fletcher Creek in the Buller District. The male holotype is held at the New Zealand Arthropod Collection.

== Description ==
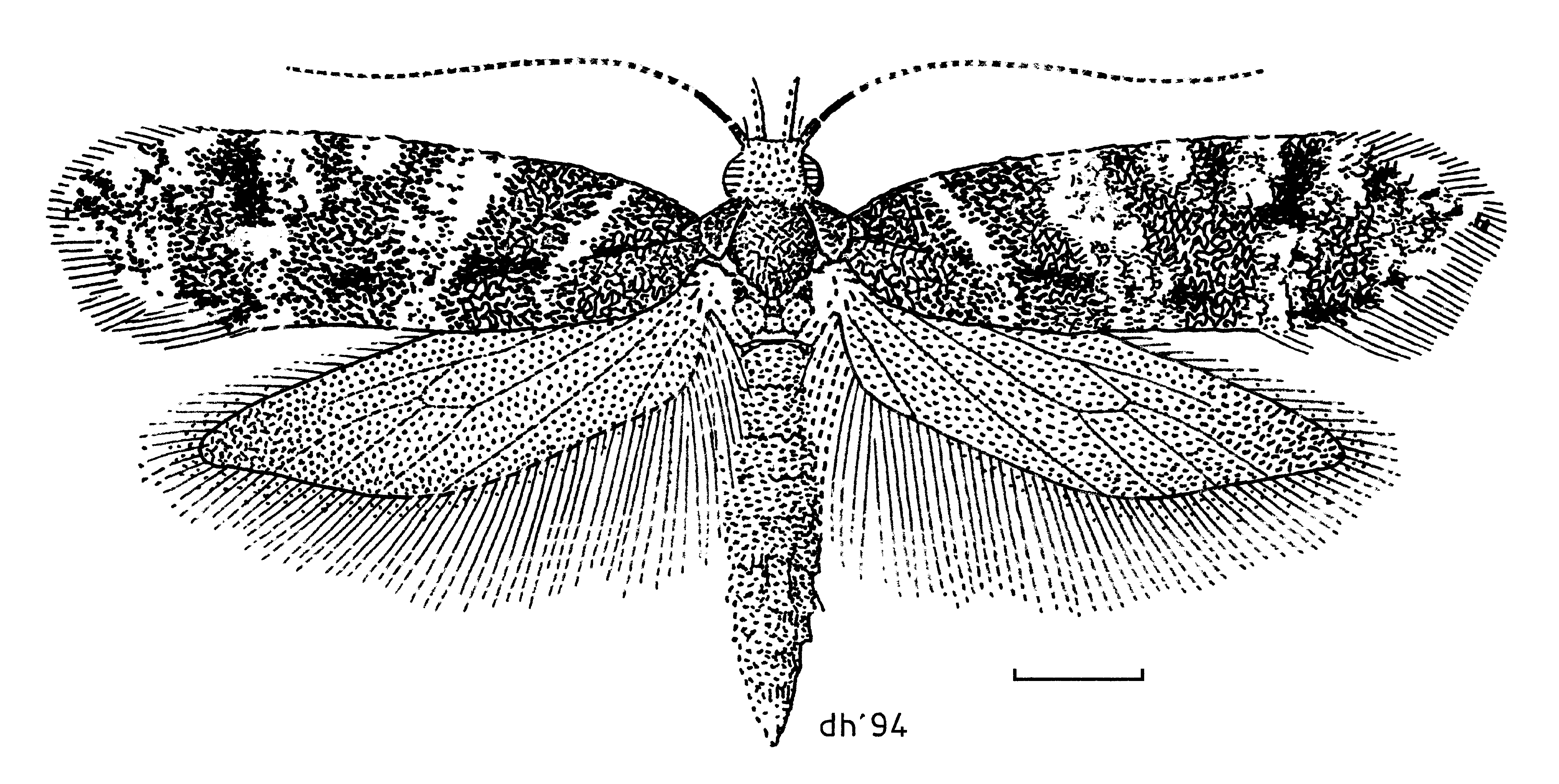
Illustration by Des Helmore.

The mature lava is between 7 and 8 mm in length, has a brown head and a green or tan body marked with a chevron like pattern.

Dugdale described the adults of this species as follows:

Wing span 10.5–12.0 mm. Colour pattern: head with upper and lower frons pale grey centrally, brown-grey laterally; antennal scape black, with a conspicuous white stripe along posterior margin; pedicel and proximal 4 flagellomeres black-scaled dorsally, other flagellomeres completely ringed with black and white; gular area white-scaled. Forewing brassy, with transverse bands narrow in cf, broader in 9 and with a few black scales included; iridescent purple areas at apex of discal cell and along CuP. Third white band (postmedian) inwardly oblique, not aligned with the 2 white costal patches beyond the 2nd (antemedian) band. Hindwings and abdomen pale to dark grey.

This species can be distinguished from similar appearing species as it lacks the white head and thorax of C. phyllocladi as well as the curved, lengthways stripe at the base of the forewing of C. glypharcha.

== Distribution ==
This species is endemic to New Zealand. As well as the type locality, this species has been collected at Ōkārito and possibly also at National Park, although this latter specimen was reared from larvae on Halocarpus bidwillii and was unable to be substantiated.

== Behaviour ==
The almost matured larvae consume the tips of shoots of their host, turning them brown and causing them to drop from the tree after a few weeks. The adult moths are on the wing in December.

== Hosts ==
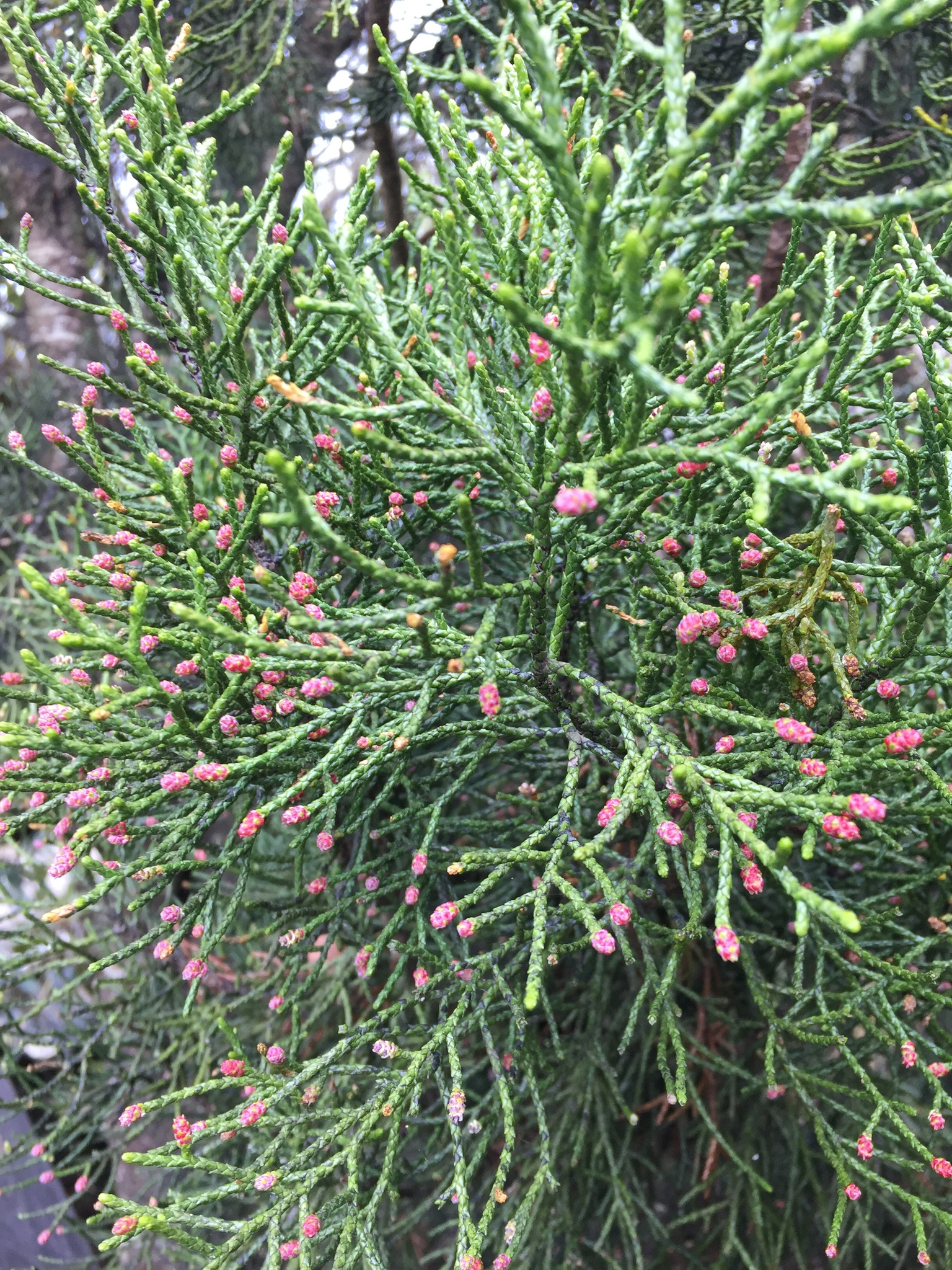
Manoao colensoi

The larval host of this species is Manoao colensoi.

== DNA analysis ==
In 2020 this species along with the other species in the genus Chrysorthenches had their DNA and morphological characters studied.
