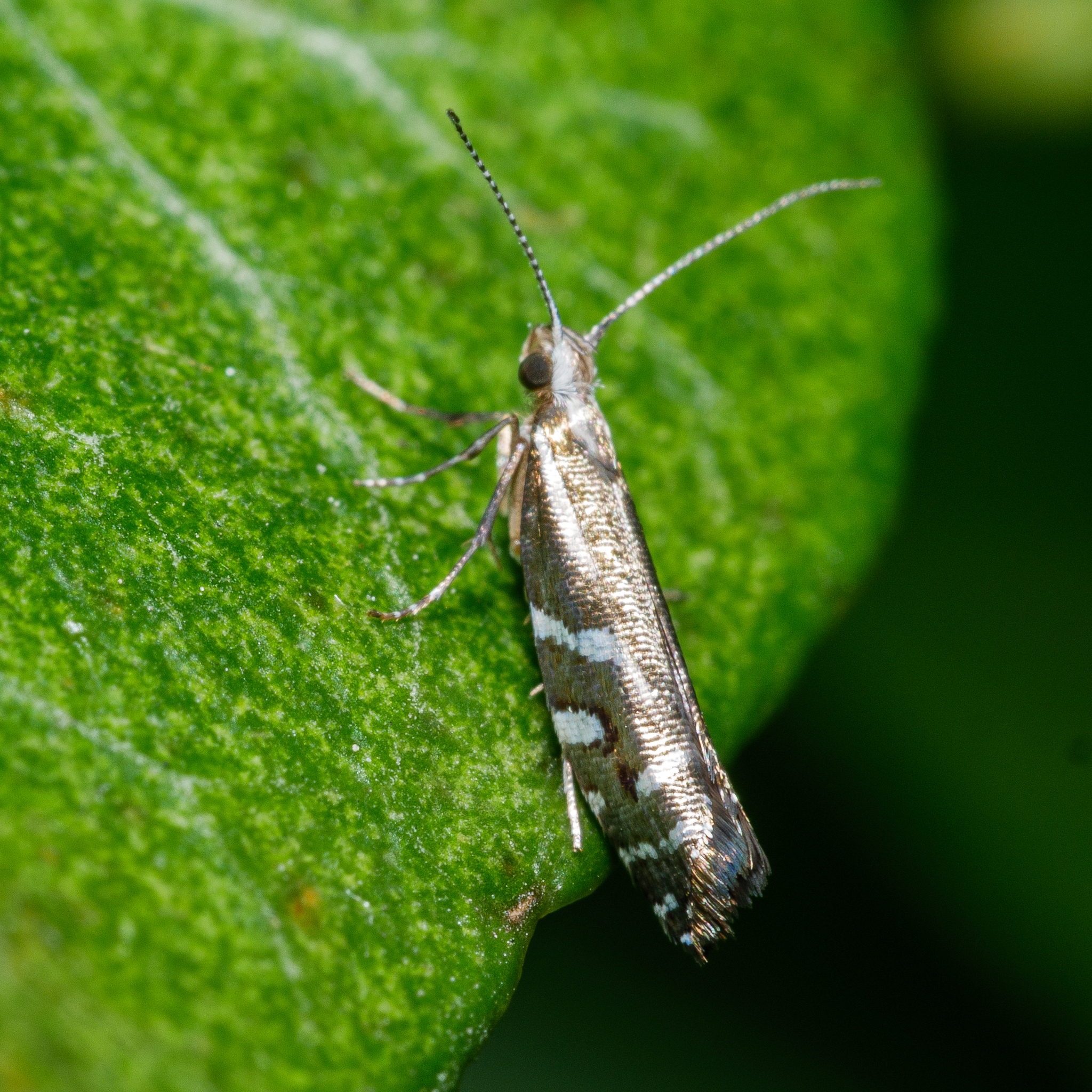

Scientific classification
- Kingdom: Animalia
- Phylum: Arthropoda
- Clade: Pancrustacea
- Class: Insecta
- Order: Lepidoptera
- Family: Plutellidae
- Genus: Chrysorthenches
- Species: C. glypharcha

Binomial name
- Chrysorthenches glypharcha (Meyrick, 1919)

Synonyms
- Orthenches glypharcha Meyrick, 1919

= Chrysorthenches glypharcha =

Species of moth endemic to New Zealand

Chrysorthenches glypharcha is a species of moth in the family Plutellidae. It was first described by Edward Meyrick in 1919. It is endemic to New Zealand and is found in the North and South Islands. This species inhabits native forest with Podocarpus trees present. The larva and pupa of this species is currently unknown but the adults are on the wing in February, October and November. The adult moths are associated with Podocarpus totara and Podocarpus laetus.

== Taxonomy ==
This species was first described by Edward Meyrick in 1919 and named Orthenches glypharcha. In 1927 Alfred Philpott discussed and described the male genitalia of this species. George Hudson discussed and illustrated this species in his 1928 book The butterflies and moths of New Zealand. In 1996 John S. Dugdale placed this species in the genus Chrysorthenches. The female lectotype, collected by George Hudson at Mount Taranaki in February, is held at the Natural History Museum, London.

== Description ==
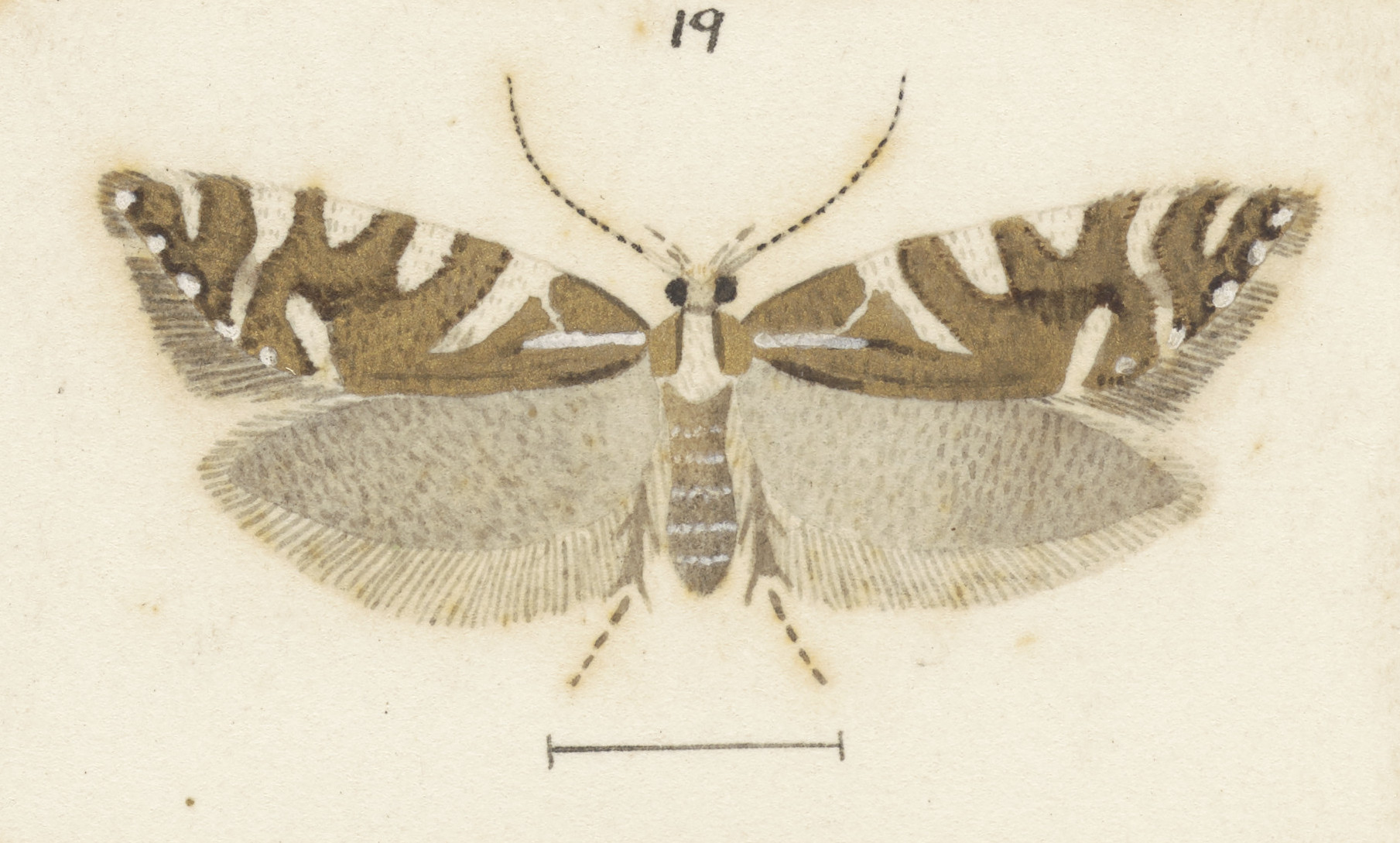
Illustration by Hudson.

Meyrick described this species as follows:

♀. 10-11 mm. Head white. Palpi white, with a bronzy lateral line. Antennae white, ringed with dark fuscous, basal portion lined with dark fuscous. Thorax white with a faint bronzy-tinged central line, patagia shining bronze. Abdomen light grey. Forewings elongate, costa moderately arched, apex pointed, termen slightly sinuate, rather strongly oblique; bright shining bronze : markings shining white; a streak along fold from base to 2/3; an oblique streak from costa before middle to fold; an oblique streak from costa beyond middle not reaching half across wing, and a slightly oblique streak from dorsum before tornus, their apices connected by a purple black mark; a purplish-black dot on tornus; three small wedge-shaped spots on costa posteriorly; three or four small marks or dots along termen, one below middle forming an erect strigula : cilia grey, basal half bronzy, round apex with three or four white bars. Hindwings grey : cilia light grey, with darker subbasal shade.

Some specimens of C. glypharcha are similar in appearance to C. polita.

== Distribution ==
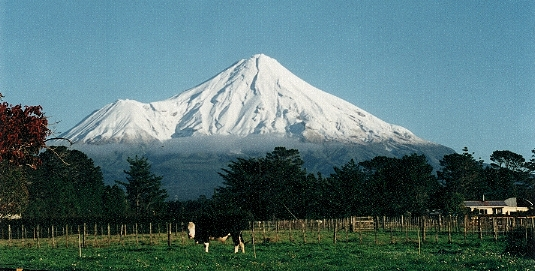
Mt Taranaki, type locality of this species.

This species is endemic to New Zealand and has been found on both the North and South Islands. As well as the type locality this species has been observed at the Motueka Valley, Arthur's Pass and Christchurch.

== Behaviour ==
Adults are on the wing in February, October and November.

== Habitat ==
This species inhabits native forest with Podocarpus trees.

== Hosts ==
The larva and pupa are unknown but the adults of this species are associated with Podocarpus totara and Podocarpus laetus.

== DNA analysis ==
In 2020 this species along with the other species in the genus Chrysorthenches had their morphological characters studied.
