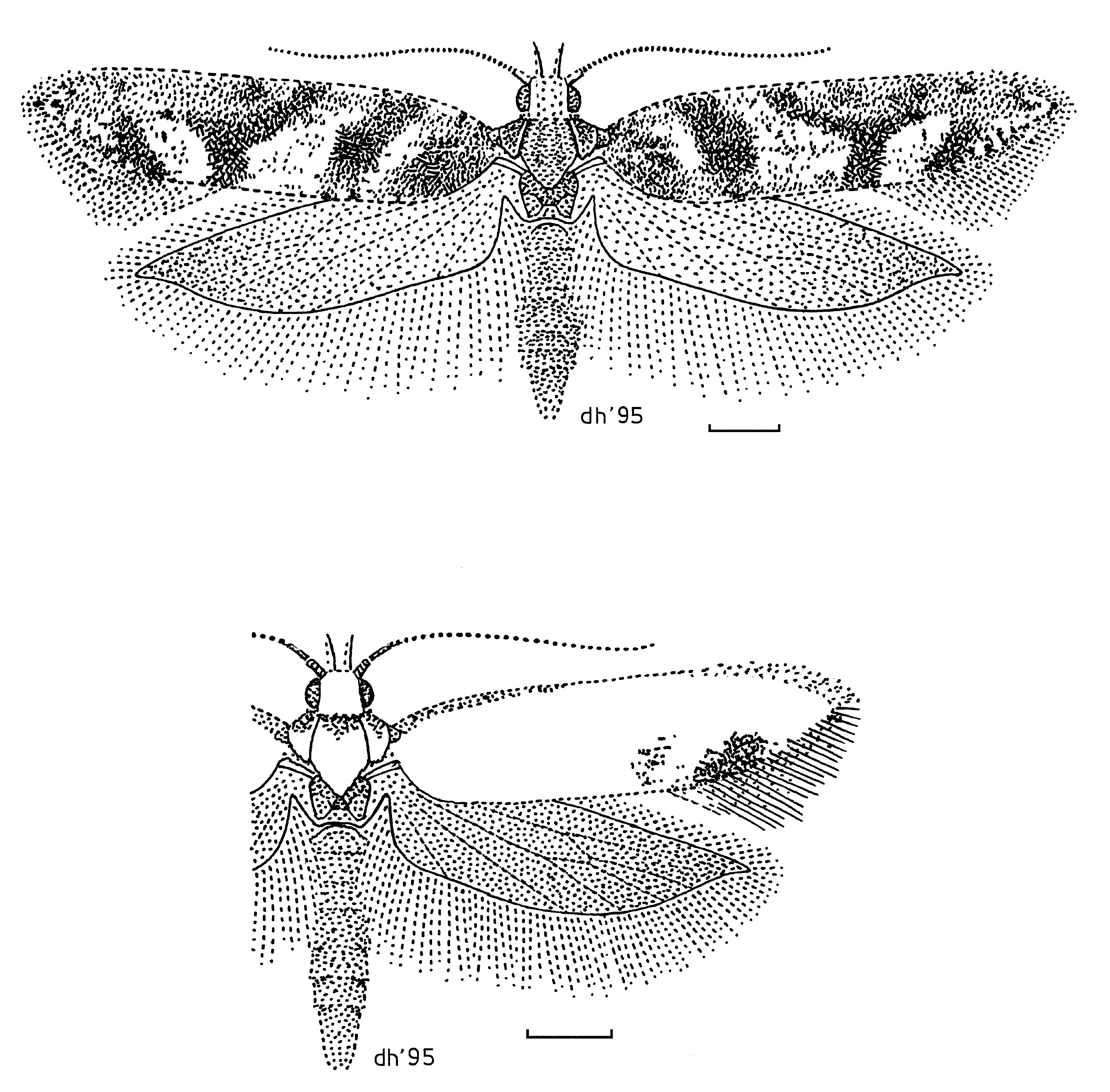
- Type species C. porphyritis

Scientific classification
- Domain: Eukaryota
- Kingdom: Animalia
- Phylum: Arthropoda
- Class: Insecta
- Order: Lepidoptera
- Family: Plutellidae
- Genus: Chrysorthenches; Dugdale, 1996

= Chrysorthenches =

Genus of moths

Chrysorthenches is a genus of moths of the family Plutellidae.

== Species ==
Species in this genus includes:

- Chrysorthenches argentea Dugdale, 1996 – New Zealand
- Chrysorthenches callibrya (Turner, 1923) – Australia
- Chrysorthenches drosochalca (Meyrick, 1905) – New Zealand
- Chrysorthenches glypharcha (Meyrick, 1919) – New Zealand
- Chrysorthenches halocarpi Dugdale, 1996 – New Zealand
- Chrysorthenches lagarostrobi Dugdale, 1996 – Tasmania, Australia
- Chrysorthenches microstrobi Dugdale, 1996 – Tasmania, Australia
- Chrysorthenches muraseae Sohn & Kobayashi, 2020 – Japan
- Chrysorthenches phyllocladi Dugdale, 1996 – New Zealand
- Chrysorthenches polita (Philpott, 1918) – New Zealand
- Chrysorthenches porphyritis (Meyrick, 1885) – New Zealand
- Chrysorthenches smaragdina Sohn, 2020 – Thailand
- Chrysorthenches virgata (Philpott, 1920) – New Zealand
