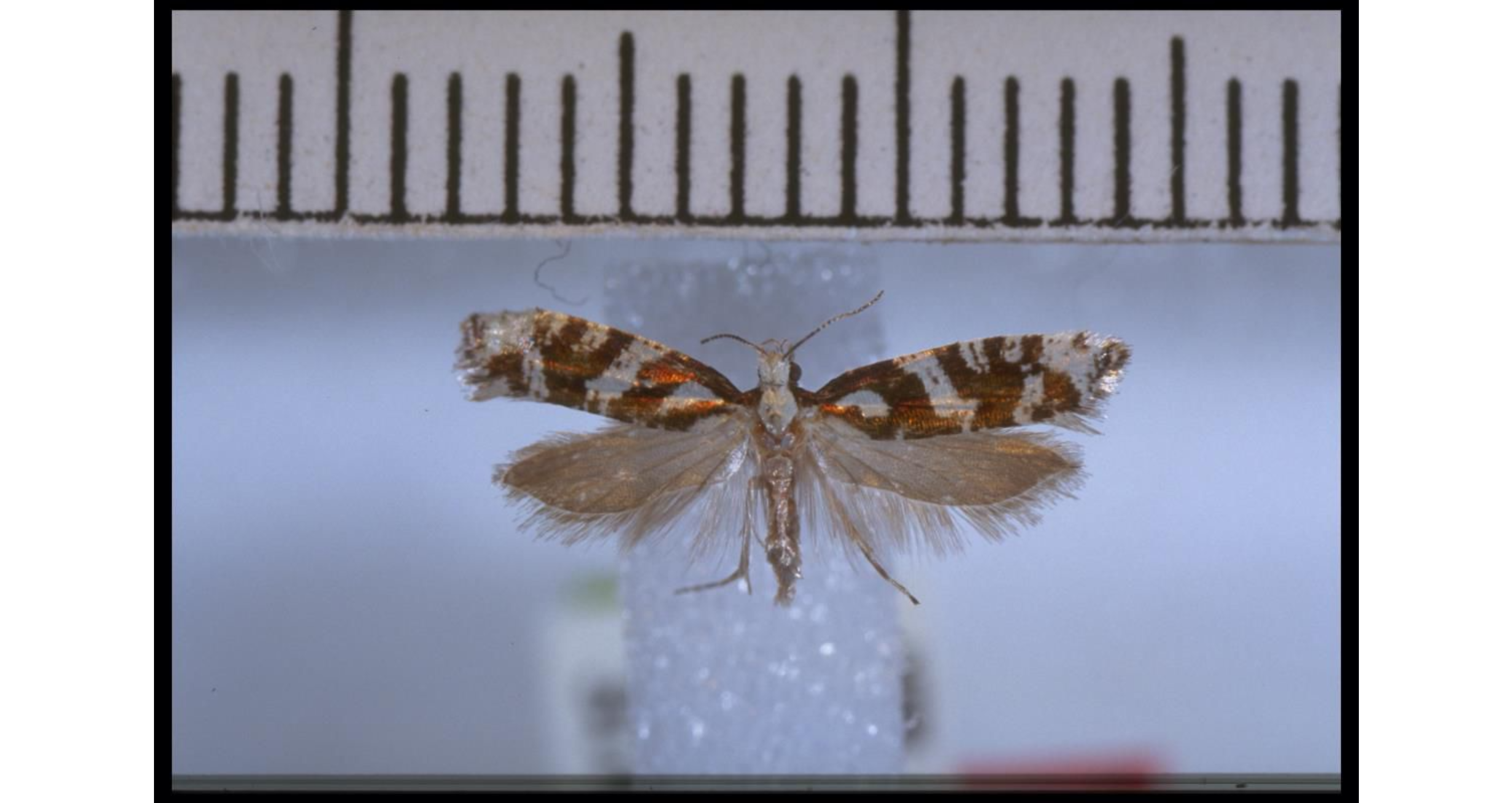
- Holotype

Scientific classification
- Kingdom: Animalia
- Phylum: Arthropoda
- Class: Insecta
- Order: Lepidoptera
- Family: Plutellidae
- Genus: Chrysorthenches
- Species: C. phyllocladi

Binomial name
- Chrysorthenches phyllocladi Dugdale, 1996

= Chrysorthenches phyllocladi =

Species of moth endemic to New Zealand

Chrysorthenches phyllocladi is a species of moth in the family Plutellidae. It was first described by John S. Dugdale in 1996. It is endemic to New Zealand and has been observed in both the North and South Islands. The larvae of this species feed on Phyllocladus alpinus. Adults have been observed on the wing in February, April and November.

== Taxonomy ==
This species was first described by John S. Dugdale in 1996. The female holotype, collected by Dugdale at Governors Bush in the Mackenzie District, is held at the New Zealand Arthropod Collection.

== Description ==
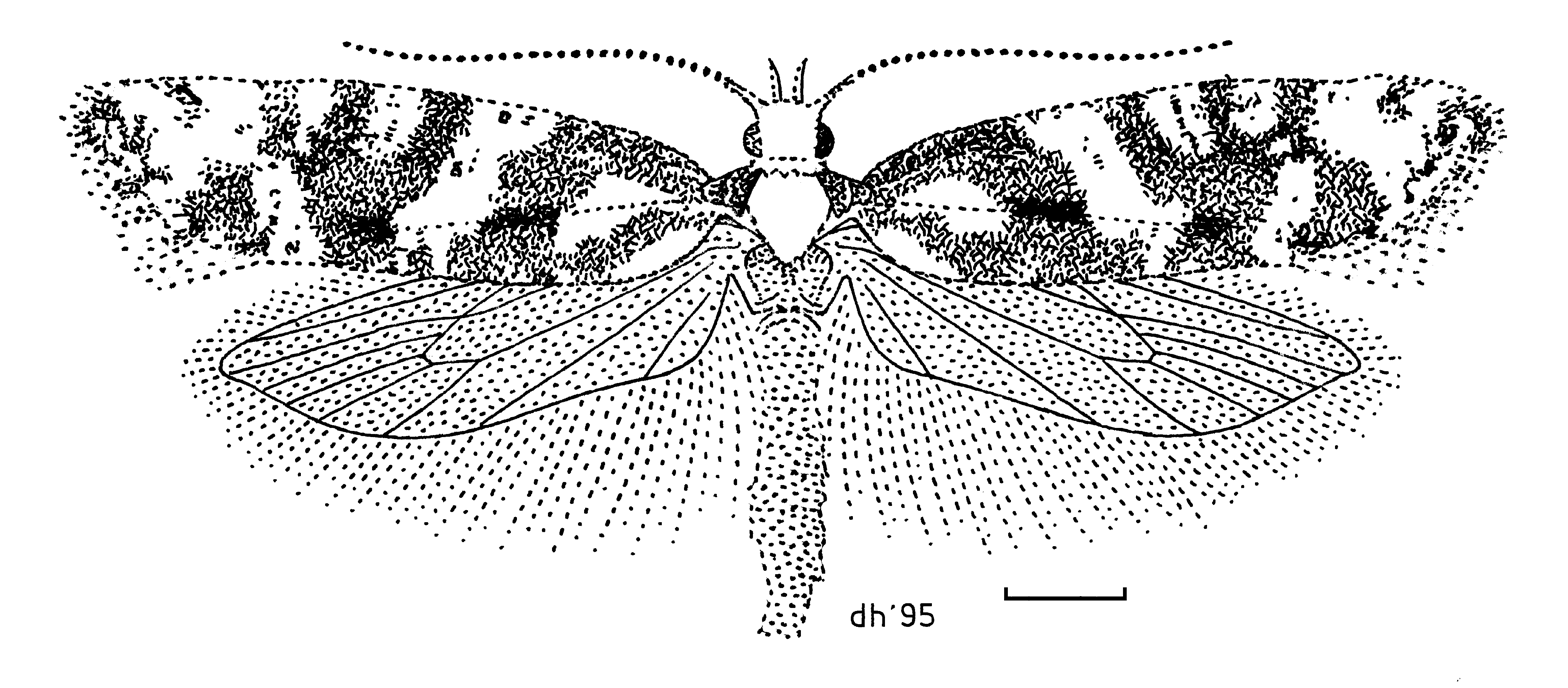
Illustration of C. phyllocladi.

Dugdale described the adults of this species as follows:

Wing span 11.5-14.0 mm. Colour pattern: head white; antennal scape, pedicel, and proximal 4 flagellomeres broadly white dorsally. Tegulae purple; mesonotum grey or brownish white in ♂, pure white in ♀. Forewing coppery purple, reflecting violet on most of costal half; white markings broader in ♀ than in ♂; basal band oblique, not meeting costa, often present as a patch centred on vein CuP, curving to dorsum (♀) or an arcuate oval (♂); anal angle (base of dorsum) broadly (♀) or narrowly (♂) white; antemedian band oblique, often with a central fine line of black scales; median band present as an obscurely divided white patch ending on discal cell; postmedian band interrupted on discal cell by a dark violet-reflecting dot; terminal area of wing largely white-scaled on costal half. Metanotum, hindwings, and abdomen dark to pale grey-scaled; thorax and abdominal venter paler-scaled. Male hindwing with a long axillary tuft extending to at least half abdomen length. Middle tibia dark, with a single white ring at mid-length.

This species can be distinguished from similar appearing moths by the pattern of white bands on its forewings, the forewing ground colour of reflective violet, and the long axillary tuft at the base of the hindwing of the male of the species.

== Distribution ==
This species is endemic to New Zealand and is found in the North and South Islands. Along with the type locality this species has been observed in the Taupo, Hawkes Bay, North Canterbury, Westland, Dunedin, Central Otago and Southland regions.

== Behaviour ==
Adult moths have been collected in February, April, and November, although Dugdale hypothesised that the November specimen was an overwintering adult.

== Hosts ==
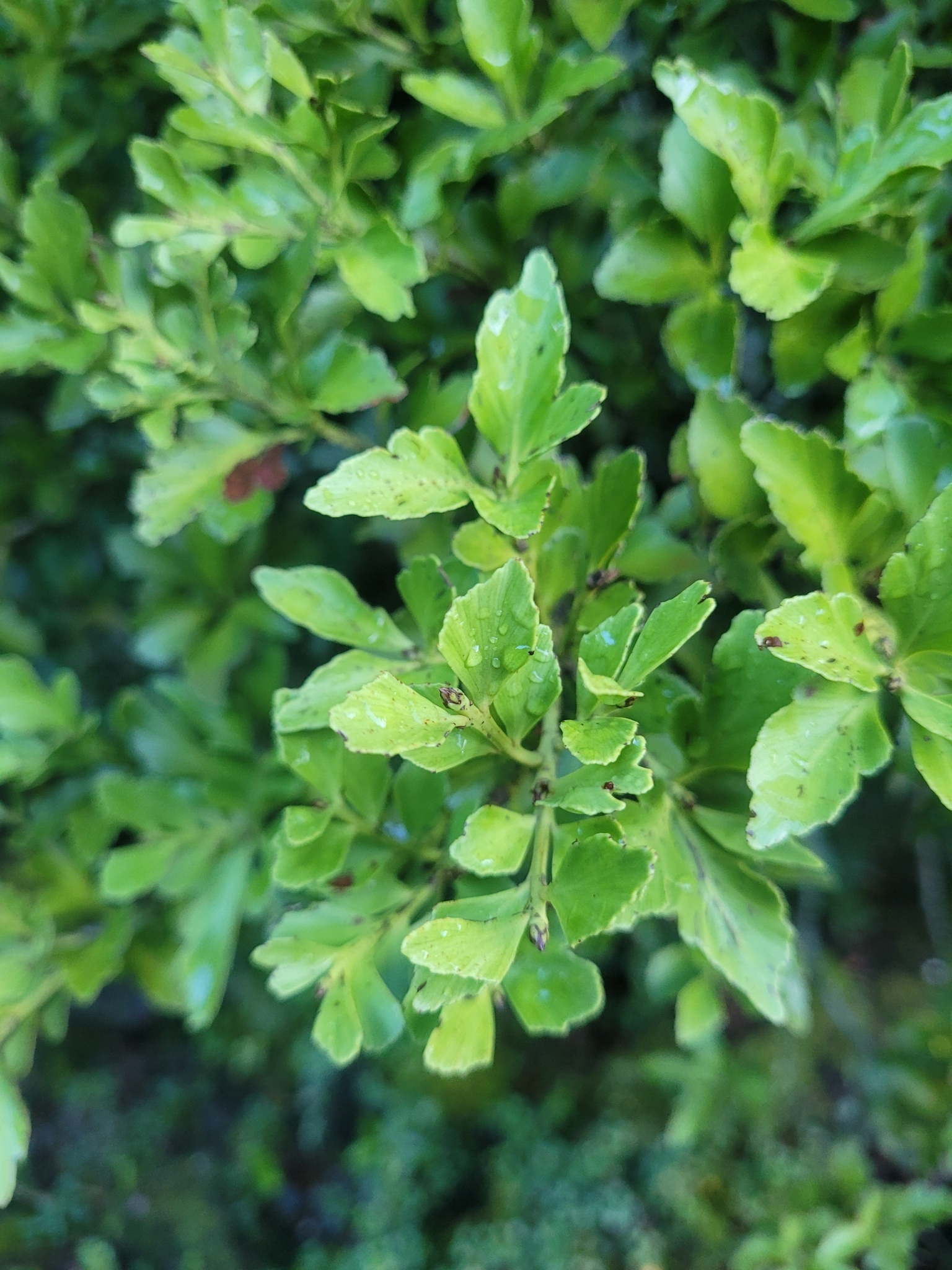
Larval host P. alpinus.

The larval host of this species is Phyllocladus alpinus.

== DNA analysis ==
In 2020 this species along with the other species in the genus Chrysorthenches had their DNA and morphological characters studied.
