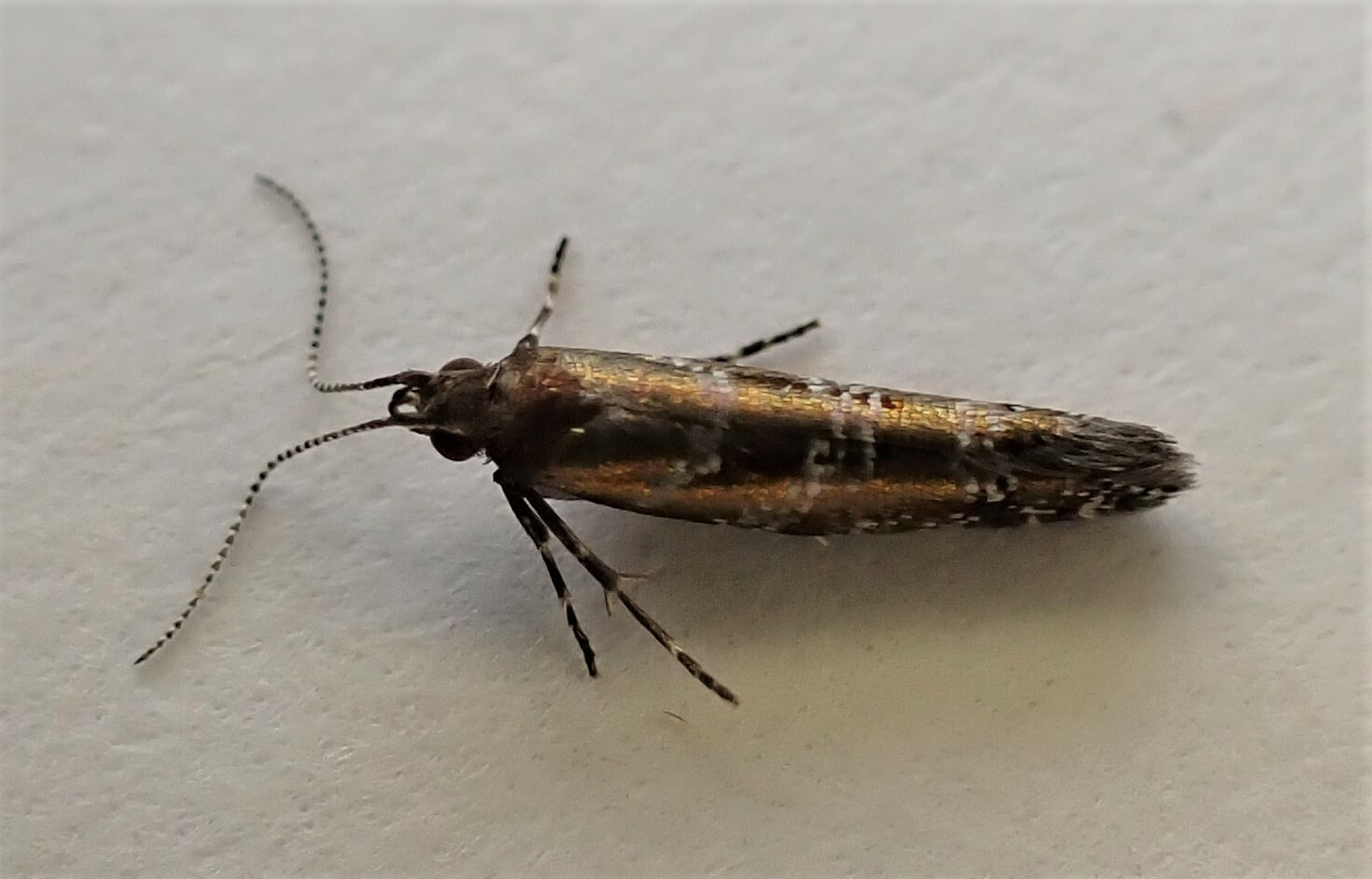

Scientific classification
- Kingdom: Animalia
- Phylum: Arthropoda
- Class: Insecta
- Order: Lepidoptera
- Family: Plutellidae
- Genus: Chrysorthenches
- Species: C. drosochalca

Binomial name
- Chrysorthenches drosochalca (Meyrick, 1905)

Synonyms
- Orthenches drosochalca Meyrick, 1905

= Chrysorthenches drosochalca =

Species of moth endemic to New Zealand

Chrysorthenches drosochalca is a species of moth in the family Plutellidae first described by Edward Meyrick in 1905. It is endemic to New Zealand and has been found in the North and South Islands. The larvae are leaf miners of Prumnopitys ferruginea. Adults are on the wing from January to March.

== Taxonomy ==
This species was first described by Edward Meyrick in 1905 using specimens collected at Otira Gorge and Wellington and named Orthenches drosochalca. George Hudson discussed and illustrated this species in his 1928 book The butterflies and moths of New Zealand. In 1996 J. S. Dugdale placed this species in the genus Chrysorthenches. The male lectotype, collected by George Hudson in Wellington, is held at the Natural History Museum, London.

== Description ==
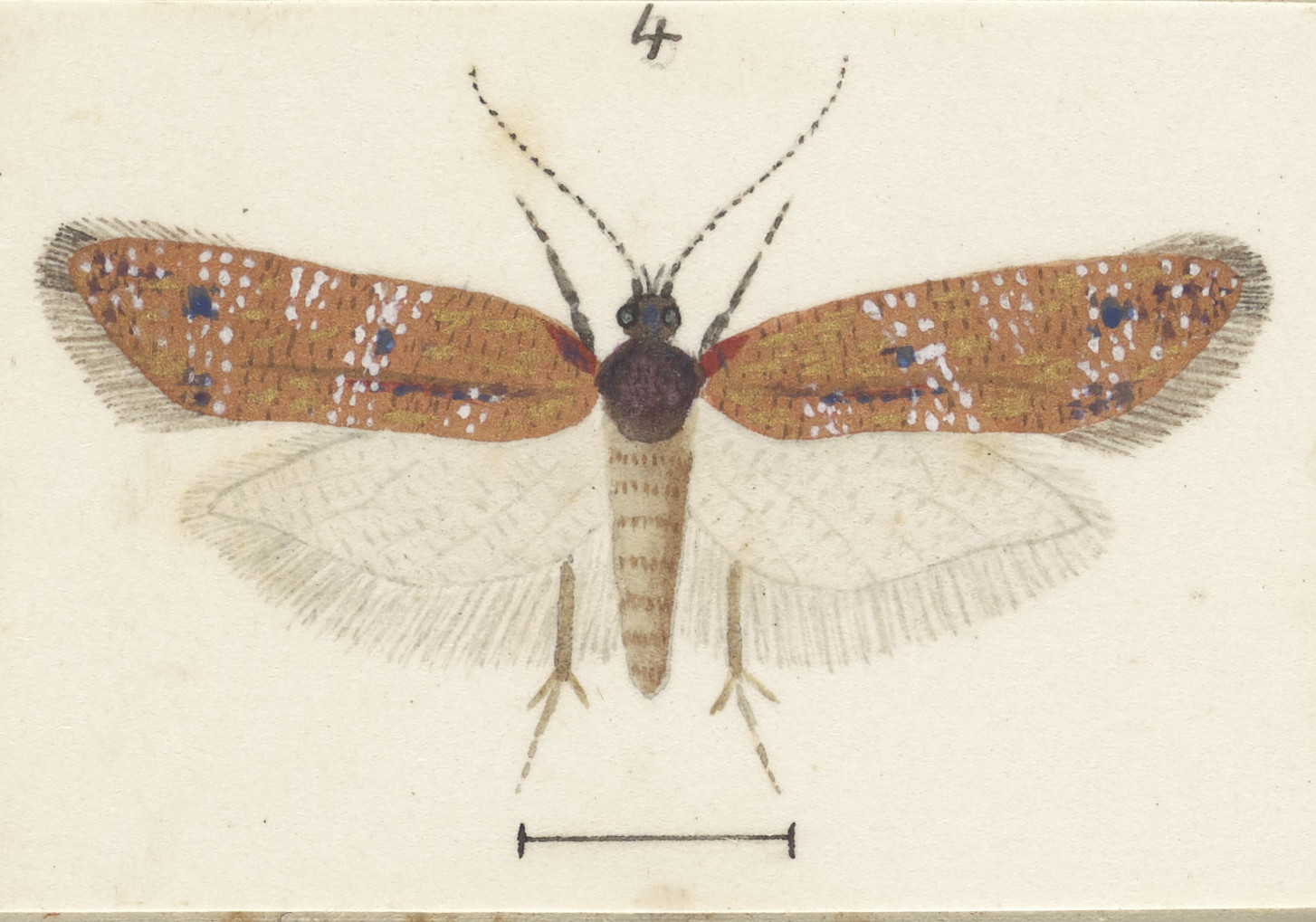
Illustration of C. drosochalca by Hudson.

Hudson described the larva and pupa of this species as follows:

The larva ... is about 1/4 inch in length, cylindrical tapering at each end with the segmental divisions deeply excised, uniform dark green and shining. The pupa is enclosed in a small oval cocoon fastened to a fern frond.

Meyrick described the adults of this species as follows:

♂♀. 11mm. Head and thorax leaden-grey. Palpi dark fuscous, inwardly and towards base white, terminal joint half as long again as second (1 1/2). Antennae dark fuscous, ringed with white. Abdomen grey, towards base pale ochreous, apex in ♂ whitish. Fore-wings elongate, costa moderately arched, apex pointed, termen sinuate, rather strongly oblique, rounded beneath; 7 to termen; shining coppery-bronze; four oblique fasciae of white irroration, first slender, second antemedian, broader, third angulated, considerably enlarged towards costa, fourth forming an apical patch extended along termen; a spot on base of costa, an interrupted streak along submedian fold, and a spot above middle of disc purple; a dark fuscous-purple transverse mark in disc at 2/3, in third fascia : cilia light grey, above apex spotted basally with purplish. Hind-wings ovate-lanceolate, apex acute, termen sinuate; light grey, darker posteriorly; cilia whitish-grey.

This species is variable in size and in the intensity of the ground colour of the forewings. It can be distinguished from similar appearing species as its forewings have very scattered white scales as well as a more brassy foreground colour.

== Distribution ==
C. drosochalca is endemic to New Zealand. It has been observed in both the North and South Islands.

== Behaviour ==
The larvae feed in January. Adults are on the wing from January until March. The species has been collected by beating Prumnopitys ferruginea. When resting the forewings are closed giving the moth the appearance of a cylinder. Both the larvae and the adult moth appear to overwinter.

== Hosts ==
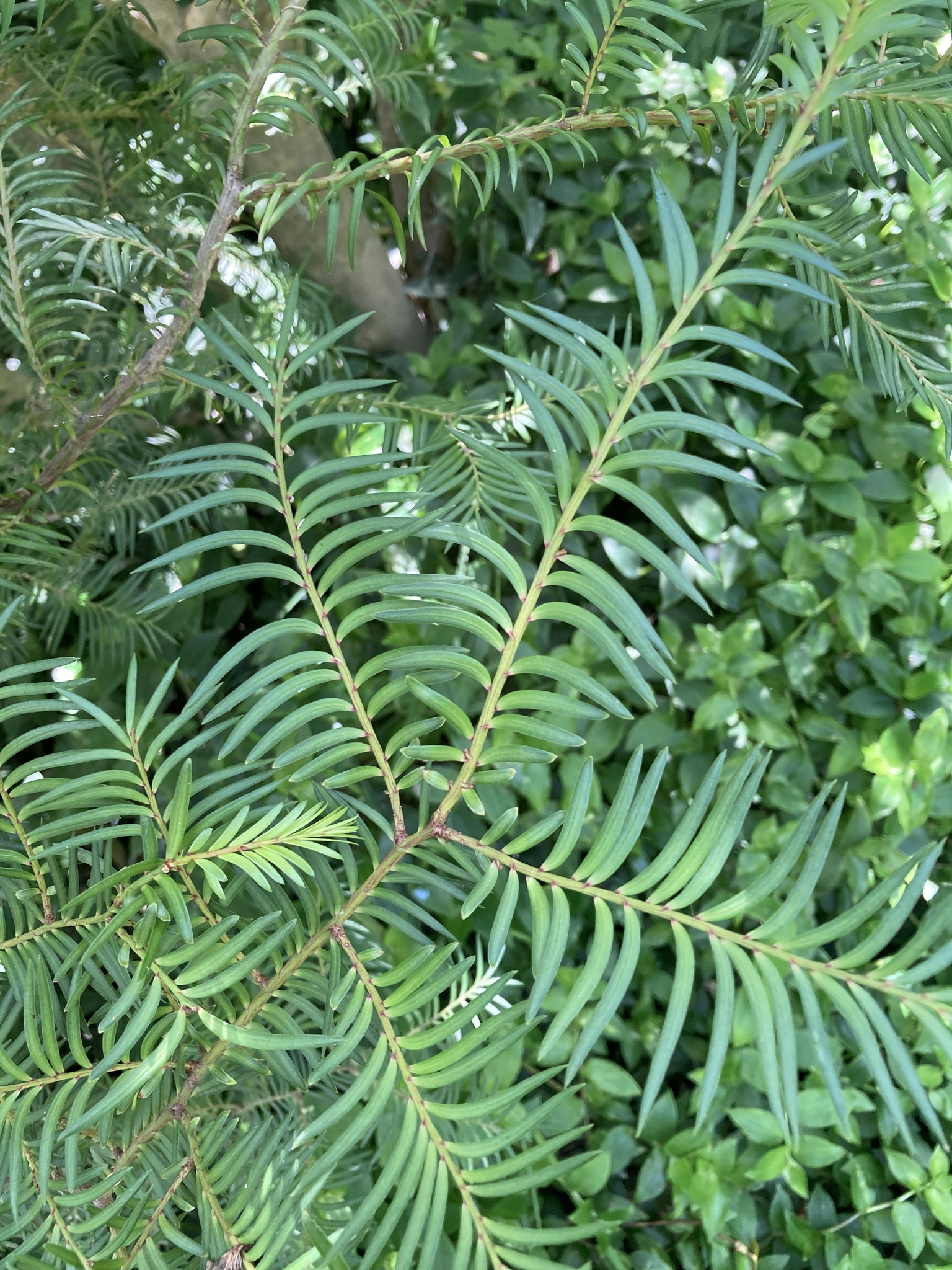
Larval host P. ferruginea.

The larval host of this species is Prumnopitys ferruginea with the larvae of C. drosochaica mining the leaves of its host.

== DNA analysis ==
In 2020 this species along with the other species in the genus Chrysorthenches had their morphological characters studied.
