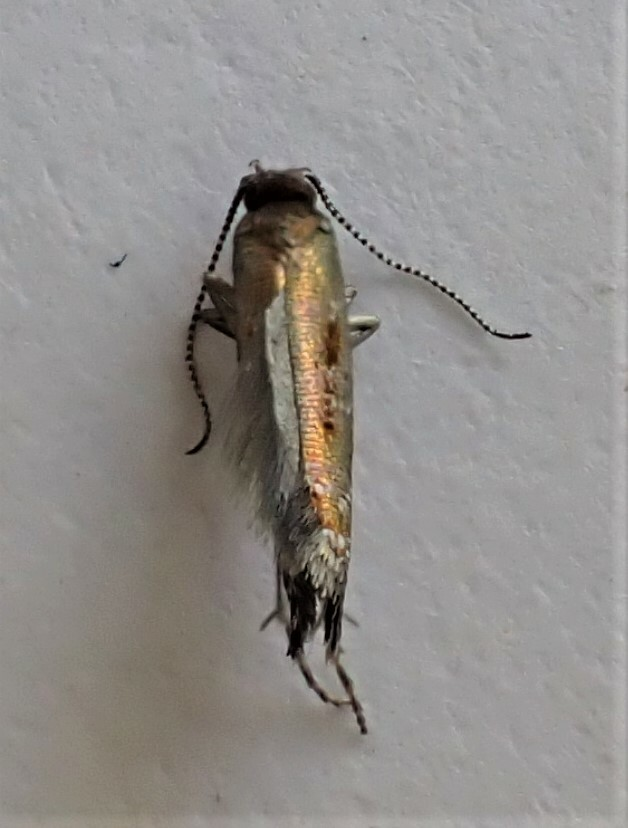

Scientific classification
- Kingdom: Animalia
- Phylum: Arthropoda
- Clade: Pancrustacea
- Class: Insecta
- Order: Lepidoptera
- Family: Plutellidae
- Genus: Chrysorthenches
- Species: C. polita

Binomial name
- Chrysorthenches polita (Philpott, 1918)

Synonyms
- Orthenches polita Philpott, 1918

= Chrysorthenches polita =

Species of moth endemic to New Zealand

Chrysorthenches polita is a species of moth in the family Plutellidae. It was first described by Alfred Philpott in 1918. It is endemic to New Zealand and it has been observed in both the North and South Islands. This species likely has two broods a year with one emerging in late spring and other in summer. The larvae mine leaves of Podocarpus species including Podocarpus totara. Adults have been observed on the wing in July to October and December to March.

== Taxonomy ==
This species was first described by Alfred Philpott in 1918 using a specimen collected at Tisbury in Invercargill and named Orthenches polita. George Hudson discussed and illustrated this species in his 1928 book The butterflies and moths of New Zealand. In 1996 John S. Dugdale placed this species in the genus Chrysorthenches. The male holotype is held at the New Zealand Arthropod Collection.

== Description ==
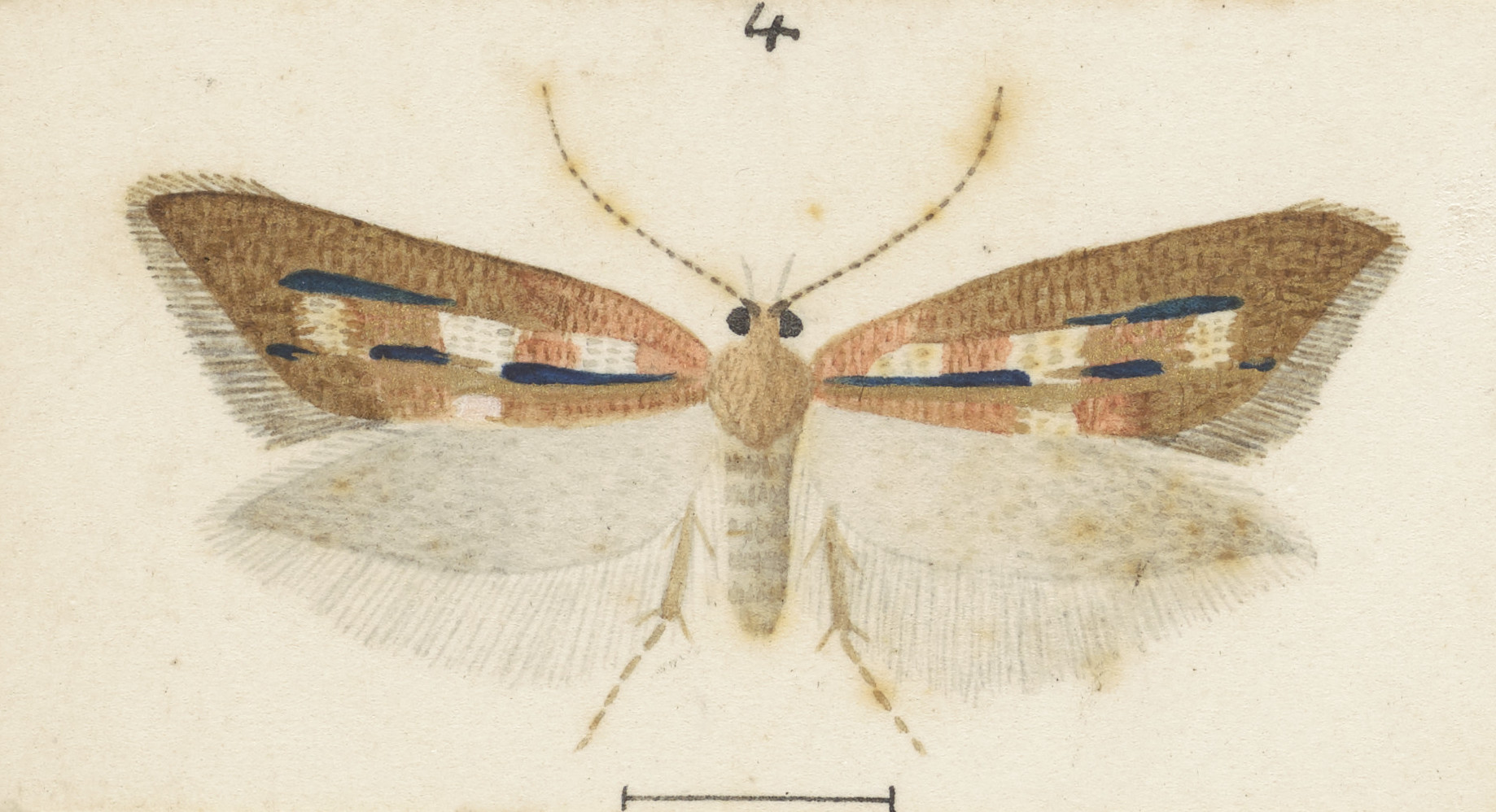
Illustration of female.

Philpott described the male adult as follows:

♂. 11mm. Head whitish-brown. Palpi white, brownish beneath. Antennae bronzy-brown, broadly annulated with white. Thorax shining-dark brown. Abdomen and legs grey-fuscous. Forewings rather long, costa moderately arched, apex obtuse, termen rounded, oblique : shining brassy with cupreous reflections; a large white oviform spot in middle near base; a broad white striga from dorsum at middle reaching half across wing; an irregular white blotch above tornus; a streak of purplish-violet from beneath basal spot along fold to tornus, attenuated at extremities and interrupted at median fascia and before tornus; a similarly coloured but more obscure streak from above median fascia to tornal blotch : cilia grey, darker round apex. Hindwings and cilia grey.

This species is small with a brassy ground colour to its forewings and frequently has a grey head.

== Distribution ==
This species is endemic to New Zealand and has been observed in both the North and South Islands.

== Behaviour ==
It has been hypothesised that this species has two broods a year with one developing over winter and emerging in late spring and the other emerging in summer. Adults have been observed on the wing in July to October and December to March.

== Hosts ==
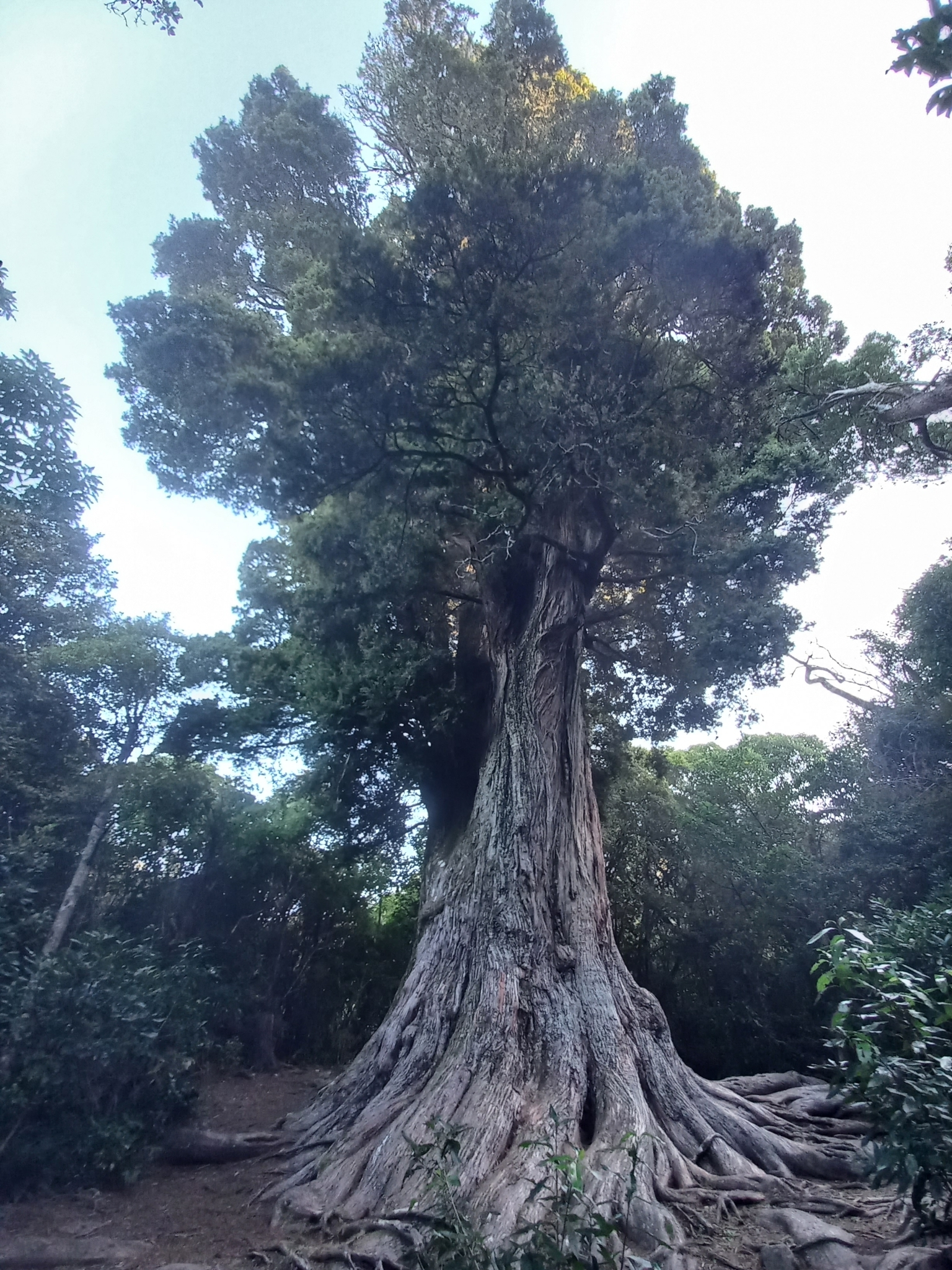
Larval host P. totara.

The larva of this species mine the leaves of species of Podocarpus including Podocarpus totara. As at 2020 the mines created by the larvae of this moth have not yet been described.

== DNA analysis ==
In 2020 this species along with the other species in the genus Chrysorthenches had their DNA and morphological characters studied.
