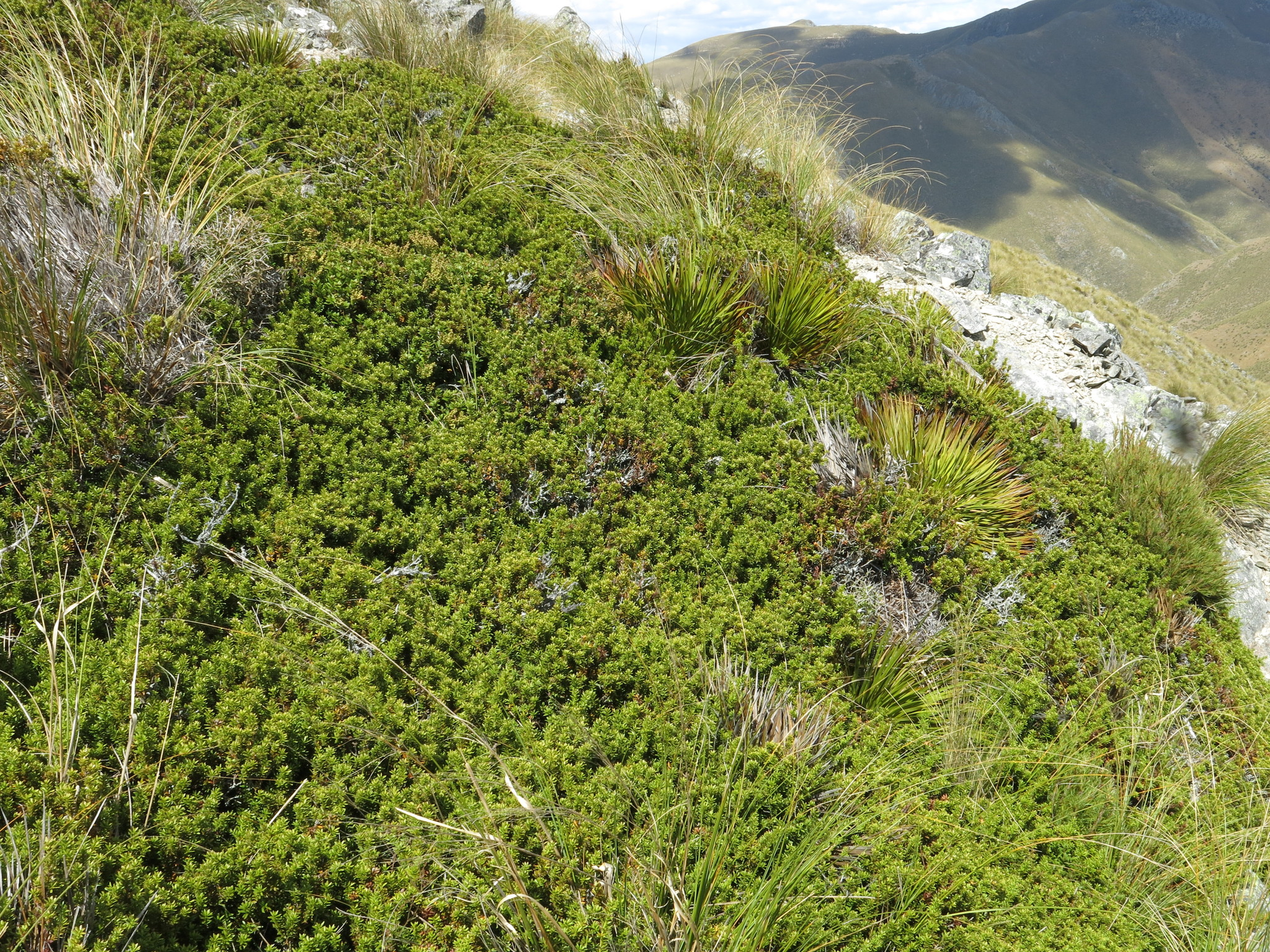
- P. nivalis in the Kakanui Mountains

Conservation status
- Least Concern (IUCN 3.1)

Scientific classification
- Kingdom: Plantae
- Clade: Tracheophytes
- Clade: Gymnosperms
- Division: Pinophyta
- Class: Pinopsida
- Order: Araucariales
- Family: Podocarpaceae
- Genus: Podocarpus
- Species: P. nivalis

Binomial name
- Podocarpus nivalis Hook.

Synonyms
- Nageia nivalis (Hook.) Kuntze; Podocarpus montanus Colenso, nom. illeg. homonym. post.; Podocarpus nivalis var. erectus Cockayne

= Podocarpus nivalis =

Species of conifer

Podocarpus nivalis, the mountain or snow tōtara, is a species of conifer in the family Podocarpaceae. It is a subshrub or shrub endemic to New Zealand.

== Name and etymology ==
Podocarpus nivalis was first described and drawn by W.J. Hooker in 1843 in his Icones Plantarum. The plant described was found on Mount Tongariro, on the North Island of New Zealand, by William Colenso, "near the limits of perpetual snow".

The species name "nivalis" means "growing in or near the snow." A vernacular name for the plant is "alpine tōtara".

== Description ==
Podocarpus nivalis grows as a shrub of 20–40 cm. with spreading branches. It can also be semi-erect and up to 2 or 3m tall. Branches that contact the soil often root. It forms mats of a few square metres.

Leaves are thick, rigid and close together. They are arranged spirally and are a brownish green colour when they age. The leaves are 3–10 mm long and 2–2.5 mm wide and boat-shaped (naviculate) to ovate-linear. They may be curved outwards or down. The leaves are obtuse or mucronate at the apex. The cones are edible bright-red arils that grow to about 1 cm in length.

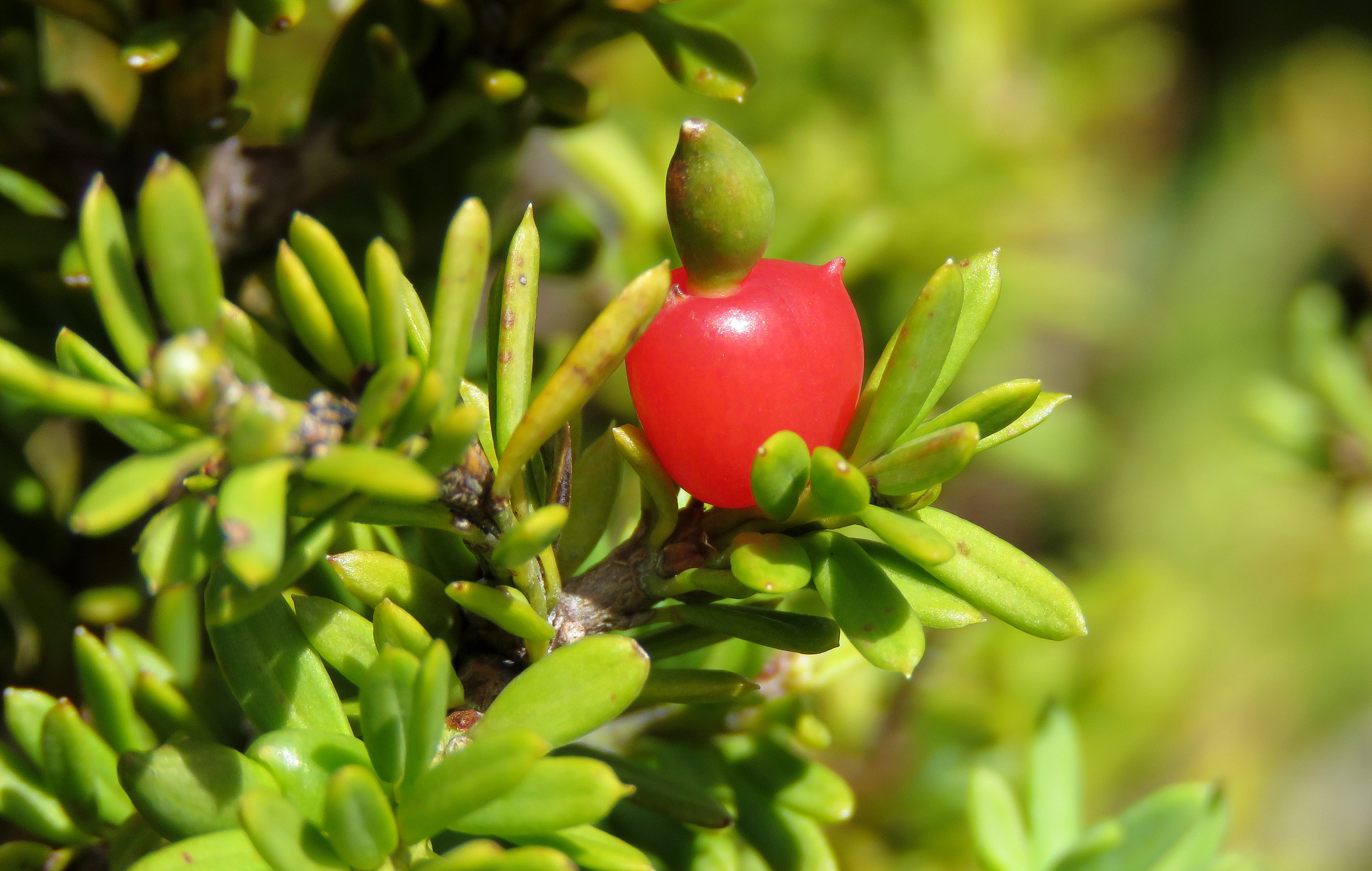
Succulent red aril of Podocarpus nivalis in Arthur's Pass National Park. The arils are edible, and have a sweet but resinous flavour.

== Distribution ==
This species is found in the North Island south of Mt Hikurangi and Mt Pirongia and in the South Island.

== Cultivation and uses ==
It is one of the hardiest podocarps of the Southern Hemisphere, it has withstood minus 25 °C (minus 13 °F) in the British Isles, and survives long periods under snow in its native habitat, close to the tree line in New Zealand's high mountains. It needs high rainfall to grow well.

== Sources ==
- Eagle, Audrey (2008). Eagle's complete trees and shrubs of New Zealand. Vol. 1. Wellington: Te Papa Press. ISBN 978-0-909010-08-9. Wikidata QQ63848025.
- Farjon, Aljos (2017). Handbook of the World's Conifers. Leiden: Brill. OCLC 971248835 (all editions).
