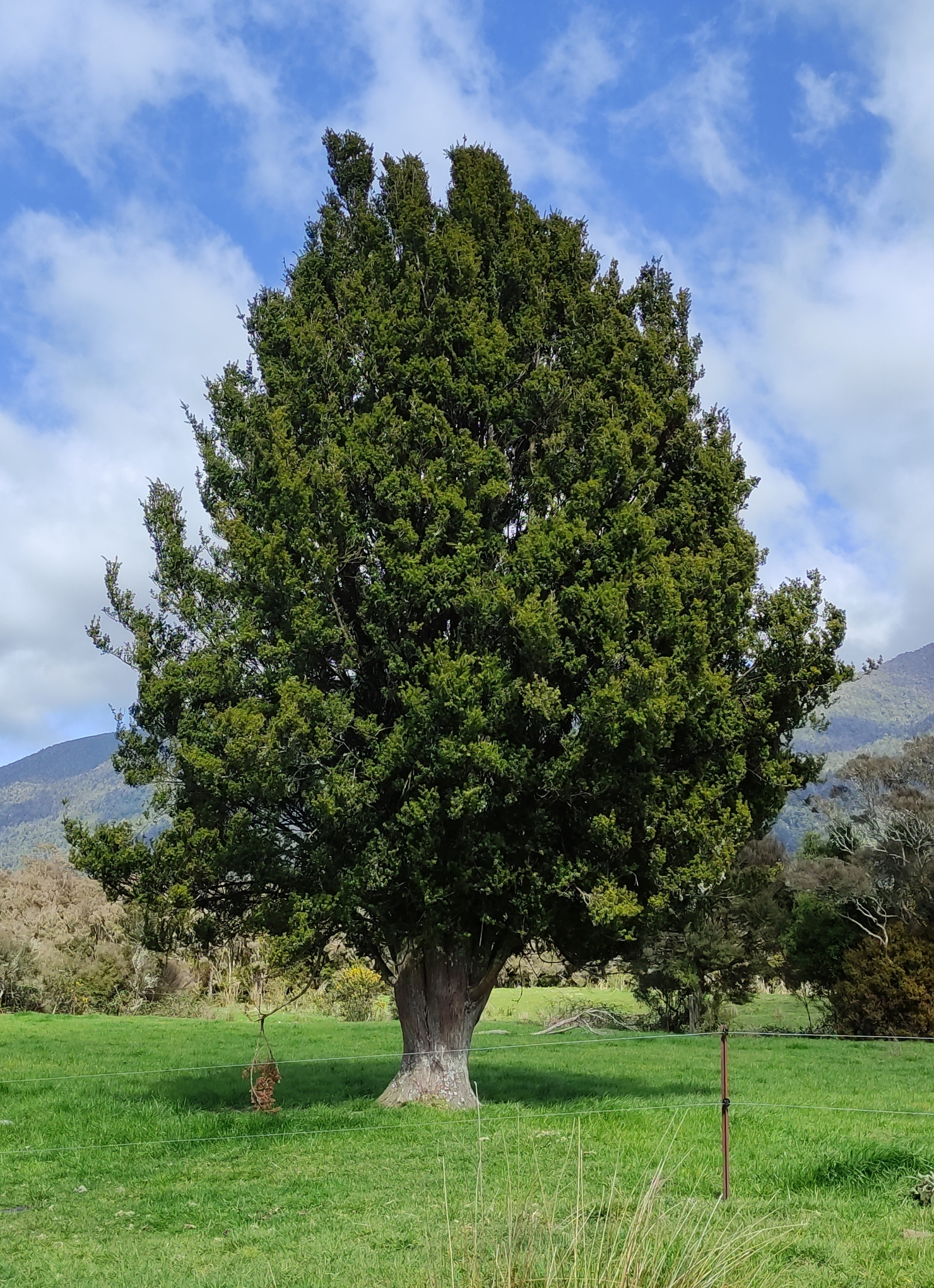

Conservation status
- Least Concern (IUCN 3.1)

Scientific classification
- Kingdom: Plantae
- Clade: Tracheophytes
- Clade: Gymnosperms
- Division: Pinophyta
- Class: Pinopsida
- Order: Araucariales
- Family: Podocarpaceae
- Genus: Podocarpus
- Species: P. laetus

Binomial name
- Podocarpus laetus Hooibr. ex Endl.

Synonyms
- Nageia hallii (Kirk) Kuntze; Nageia laeta (Hooibr. ex Endl.) Kuntze; Podocarpus cunninghamii Colenso; Podocarpus hallii Kirk; Podocarpus totara var. hallii (Kirk) Pilg.

= Podocarpus laetus =

Species of conifer

Podocarpus laetus, Hall's tōtara, mountain tōtara or thin-barked tōtara, is a species of conifer in the family Podocarpaceae. Previously known as Podocarpus hallii and Podocarpus cunninghamii, in 2015 it was realised that the much earlier name P. laetus has priority. Its common name results from the species being named after J. W. Hall, a New Zealand pharmacist.

It is endemic to New Zealand. It can be found growing in both montane and subalpine forests but less common in lowland forests.

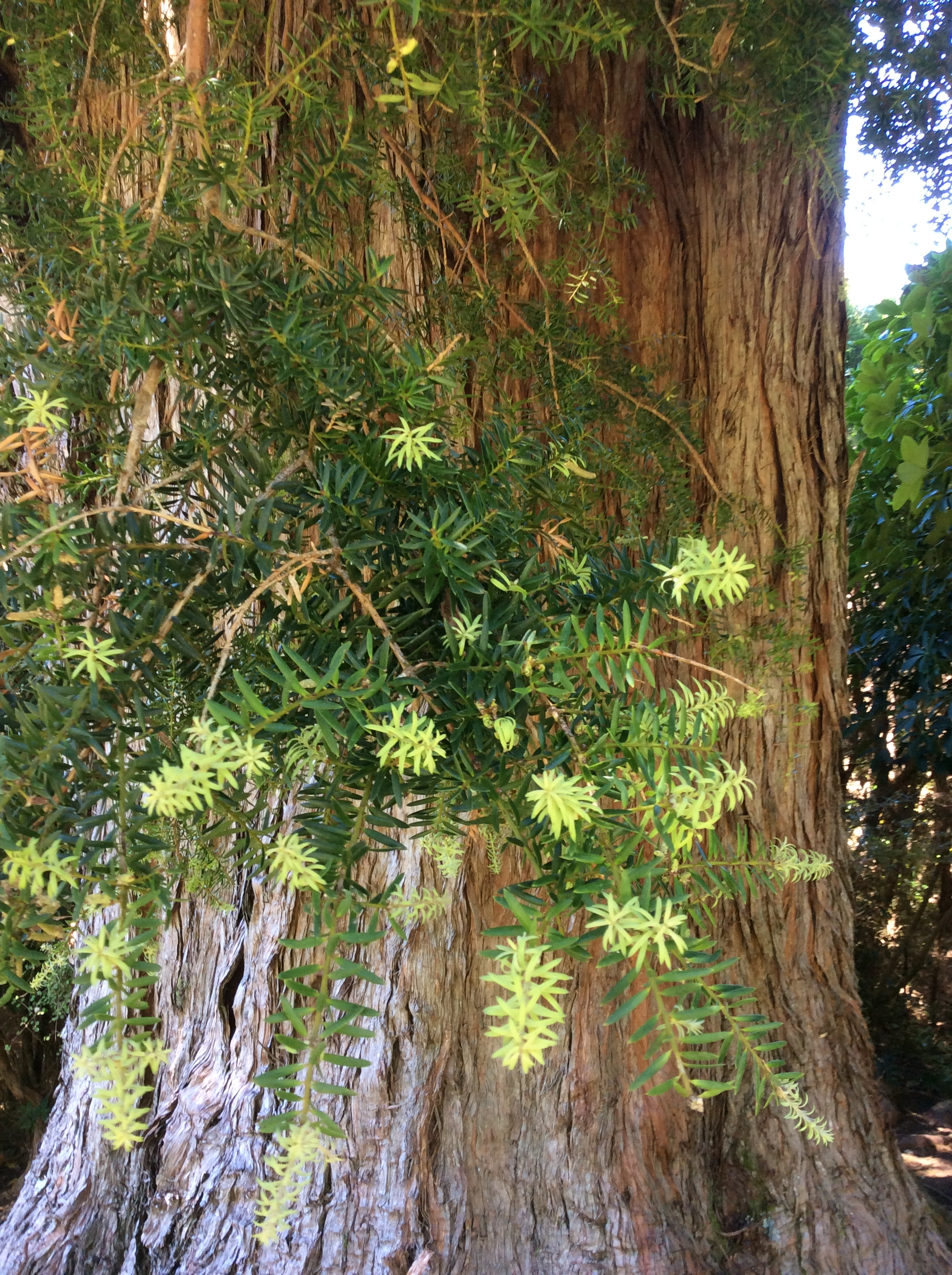
Hall's tōtara, Hinewai, New Zealand

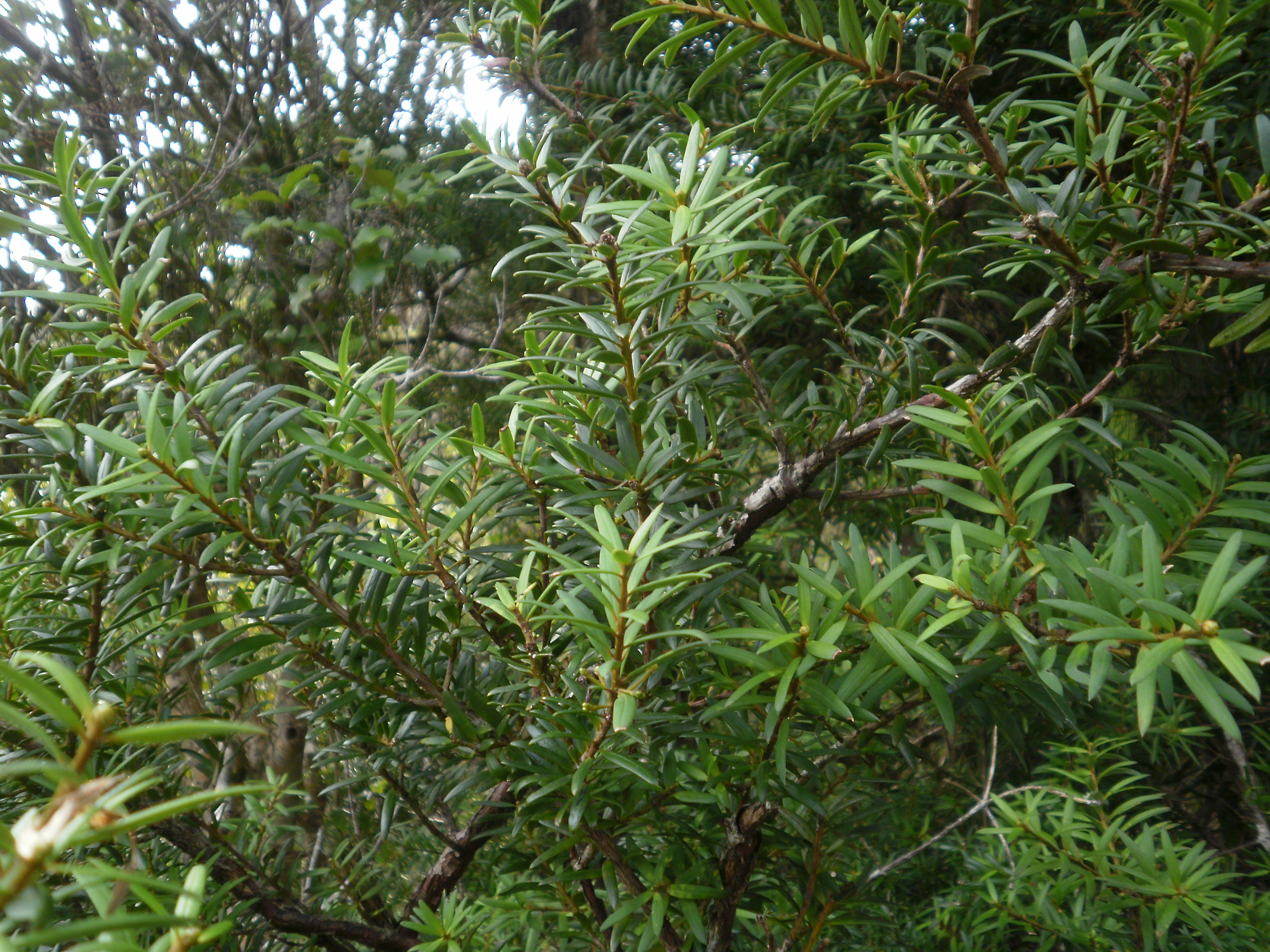
Hall's tōtara foliage

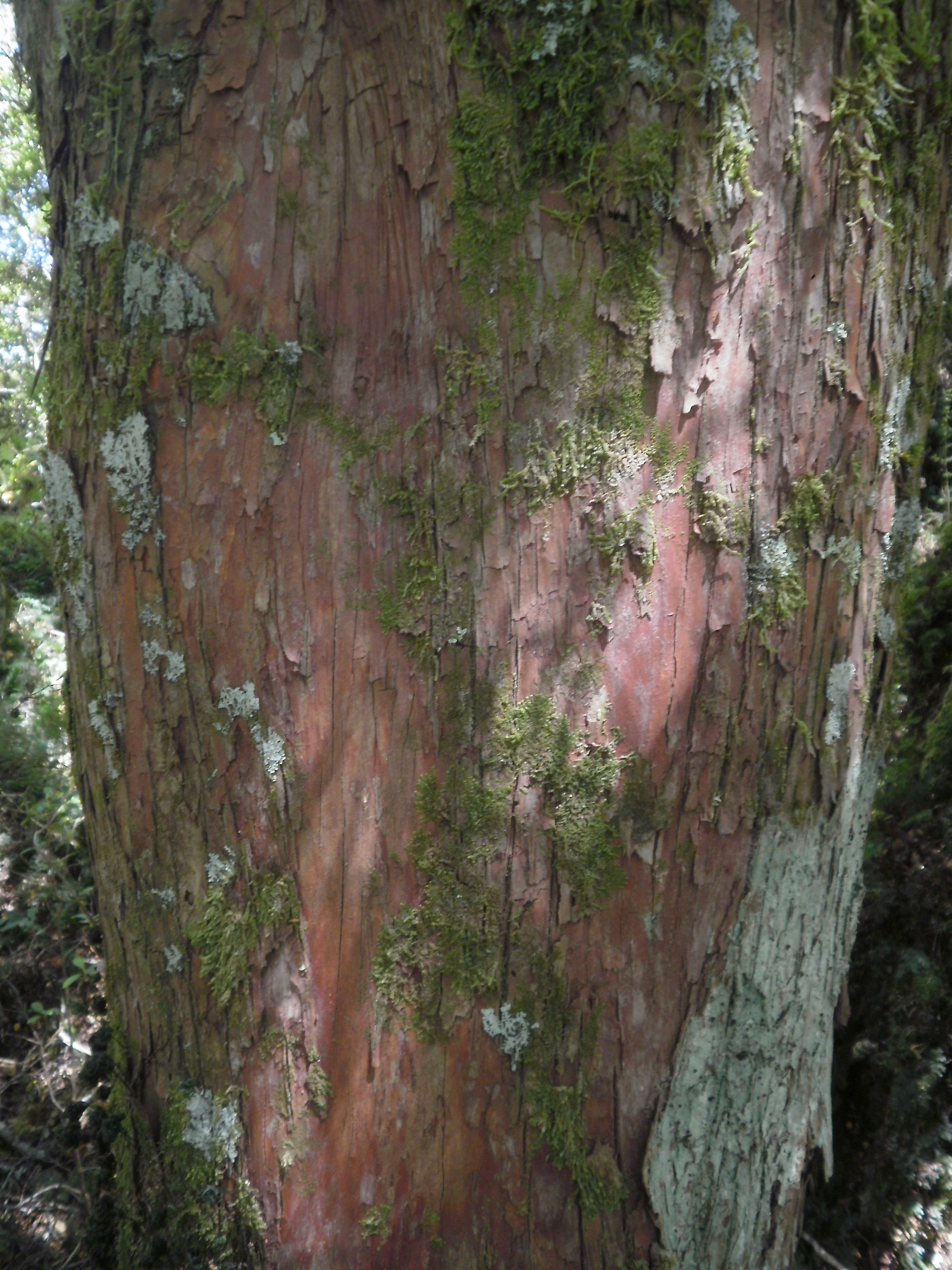
Hall's tōtara bark is thin and flaky compared to that of P. tōtara

P. laetus is distinguished from the more widely known lowland tōtara by its thinner bark, longer juvenile leaves and distribution at higher altitudes.

P. laetus plays host to the endemic insects Ambeodontus tristis and Oemona hirta.
