= Newsome (surname) =

- Pronunciation: /ˈnjuːsəm/
- Language: English

Origin
- Language: Old English
- Meaning: "new houses"
- Region of origin: England

Other names
- Variant forms: Newsham, Newsam, Newson, Newsholme

Newsome is a surname of Anglo-Saxon origin, derived from the Old English words "nīwe" (new) and "hūs" (house), meaning "place at the new houses". The surname Newsome is associated with various places named Newsome, Newsham, Newsam, or Newsholme in northern England.

People with the surname include:

- Ab Newsome (1920–1979), Canadian ice hockey player
- Alex Newsome (born 1996), Australian rugby union footballer
- Albert R. Newsome (1894–1951), American historian and academic
- Billy Newsome (1948–2024), American football player
- Bree Newsome (born 1985), American activist and filmmaker
- Carman Newsome (1912–1974), American actor, musician and band conductor
- Chloe Newsome (born 1976), English actress
- Chris Newsome (born 1990), Filipino-American basketball player
- Corina Newsome, American ornithologist
- Craig Newsome (born 1971), American football player
- Curt Newsome (1958–2026), American football coach
- David Newsome (1942–2011), American ophthalmologist
- Dazz Newsome (born 1999), American football player
- Debbie Newsome (born 1960), Australian singer and television host
- Detrez Newsome (born 1994), American football player
- Dick Newsome (1909–1965), American baseball pitcher
- Donnie Newsome (born 1950), American politician and judge from Kentucky
- Effie Lee Newsome (1885–1979), American writer of the Harlem Renaissance
- Grant Newsome (born 1997), American football coach
- Greg Newsome II (born 2000), American football player
- Harry Newsome (born 1963), American football player
- Hawk Newsome, American activist
- Hugh C. Newsome, American teacher, state legislator and judge in Arkansas
- Jack Newsome (born 1996), American singer, songwriter and producer
- Jalonne White-Newsome, American climate activist
- Jamar Newsome (born 1987), American football player
- Jene Newsome, discharged United States Air Force sergeant
- John P. Newsome (1893–1961), American politician from Alabama
- John R. Newsome, American district attorney in Colorado
- Jon Newsome (born 1970), English football player and coach
- Jonathan Newsome (born 1991), American football player
- J. Thomas Newsome (1869–1942), American lawyer in Virginia
- Kevin Newsome (born 1991), American football quarterback
- Ljay Newsome (born 1996), American baseball pitcher
- Natasha Newsome Drennan, Irish politician
- Noel Newsome (1906–1976), British broadcasting executive
- Omer Newsome (1900–1933), American baseball pitcher
- Ozzie Newsome (born 1956), American football player and executive
- Paul Newsome (born 1977), British guitarist/songwriter for Proud Mary
- Paula Newsome (born 1961), American actress
- Pauline Newsome (1825–1904), German-British circus equestrian
- Peter Newsome (born 1943), English glass sculptor
- Quinton Newsome (born 2001), American football player
- Rashaad Newsome (born 1979), American artist
- Ron Newsome (1943–2012), American football coach
- Roy Newsome (1930–2011), British conductor and composer
- Sam Newsome (born 1965), American jazz musician
- Sandy Newsome, American politician from Wyoming
- Skeeter Newsome (1910–1989), American baseball player
- Stella Newsome (1889–1969), British teacher and suffragette
- Steven Newsome (1952–2012), American arts and museum administrator
- Tawny Newsome (born 1983), American musician, comedian and actress
- Timmy Newsome (born 1958), American football player
- Vince Newsome (born 1961), American football player
- William Newsome (born 1952), American neuroscientist

== See also ==
- Newsom, surname
- Newson, surname and given name
