= Pheromone trap =

Type of insect trap that uses pheromones to lure insects

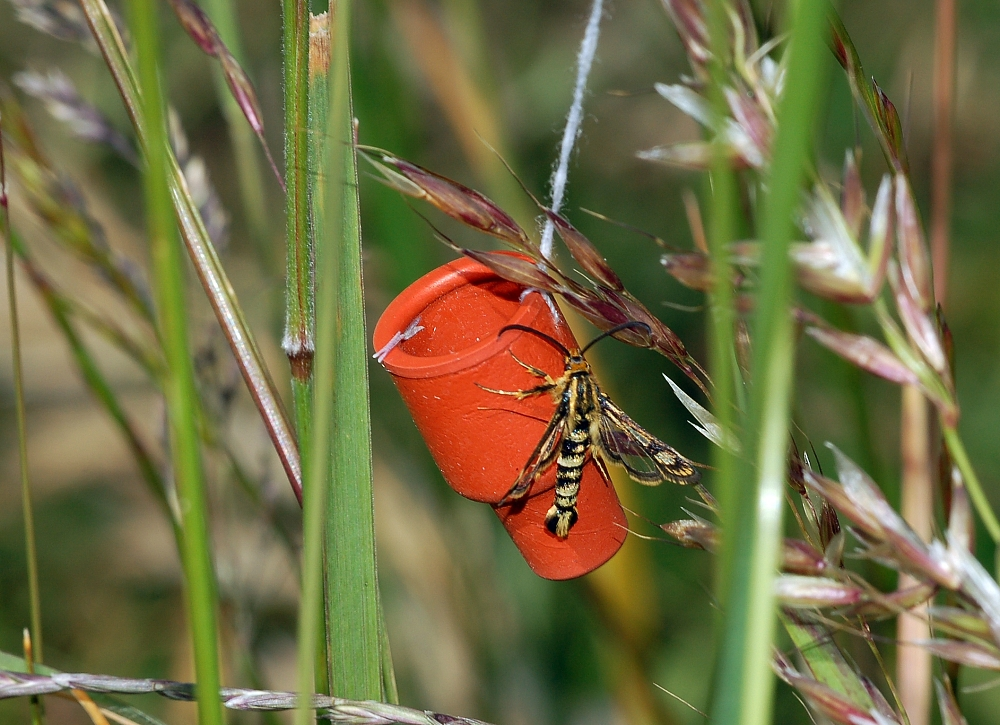
Chamaesphecia empiformis (Sesiidae) on a red rubber septum pheromone lure

A pheromone trap is a type of insect trap that uses pheromones to lure insects. Sex pheromones and aggregating pheromones are the most common types used. A pheromone-impregnated lure is encased in a conventional trap such as a bottle trap, delta trap, water-pan trap, or funnel trap. Pheromone traps are used both to count insect populations by sampling, and to trap pests such as clothes moths to destroy them.

== Sensitivity ==
Pheromone traps are very sensitive, meaning they attract insects present at very low densities. They are often used to detect presence of exotic pests, or for sampling, monitoring, or to determine the first appearance of a pest in an area. They can be used for legal control, and are used to monitor the success of the Boll Weevil Eradication Program and the spread of the spongy moth. The high species-specificity of pheromone traps can also be an advantage, and they tend to be inexpensive and easy to implement. This sensitivity is especially suited to some investigations of invasive species: Flying males are easily blown off course by winds. Rather than introducing noise, Frank et al. 2013 find this can actually help detect isolated nests or populations and determine the length of time necessary between introduction and establishment. (Although any trap can answer the same questions, high sensitivity such as provided by pheromone traps does so more accurately.)

However, it is impractical in most cases to completely remove or "trap out" pests using a pheromone trap. Some pheromone-based pest control methods have been successful, usually those designed to protect enclosed areas such as households or storage facilities. There has also been some success in mating disruption. In one form of mating disruption, males are attracted to a powder containing female attractant pheromones. The pheromones stick to the males' bodies, and when they fly off, the pheromones make them attractive to other males. It is hoped that if enough males chase other males instead of females, egg-laying will be severely impeded.

Some difficulties surrounding pheromone traps include sensitivity to bad weather, their ability to attract pests from neighboring areas, and that they generally only attract adults, although it is the juveniles in many species that are pests. They are also generally limited to one sex.

== Targets ==
Though certainly not all insect pheromones have been discovered, many are known and many more are discovered every year. Some sites curate large lists of insect pheromones. Pheromones are frequently used to monitor and control lepidopteran and coleopteran species, with many available commercially. Pheromones are available for insects including:

- African bollworm
- African cotton leafworm
- Apple brown tortrix
- Apple clearwing moth
- Apple fruit moth
- Apple maggot
- Artichoke moth
- Asian beetle
- Asian corn borer moth
- Baluchistan fruit fly
- Banana weevil
- Banded elm bark beetle
- Barred fruit-tree tortrix
- Beech tortrix moth
- Beet armyworm
- Bertha armyworm
- Black cutworm
- Blueberry maggot
- Bollworm
- Bright-line brown-eye or tomato moth
- Brown oak tortrix
- Cabbage leaf roller
- Cabbage looper moth
- Cabbage moth
- Carnation tortrix
- Carob moth
- Cherry-bark moth
- Cherry fruit fly
- Citrus cutworm
- Citrus flower moth
- Citrus leafmining moth
- Citrus mealybug
- Codling moth
- Corn earworm
- Corn stalk borer
- Cucumber fruit fly
- Cucumber moth
- Currant clearwing moth
- Cutworm
- Date palm fruit stalk borer
- Diamond back moth
- Douglas-fir tussock moth
- Dubas bug
- Durra stem borer
- Eastern cherry fruit fly
- Eggplant shoot and fruit borer
- Egyptian cotton leaf worm
- Engraver beetle
- European corn borer
- European goat moth
- European pine shoot moth
- European spruce bark beetle
- Eye-spotted bud moth
- Fall armyworm
- False codling moth
- Fruit fly
- Fruit tree leaf roller
- Garden pebble
- Golden leaf roller
- Golden twin moth or groundnut semi-looper moth
- Grape moth or vine moth
- Green oak moth
- Grey tortrix
- Hants moth
- Japanese beetle
- Jasmine moth
- Large fruit tree tortrix
- Leche's twist moth
- Leek moth or onion moth
- Legume pod borer
- Leopard moth
- Lesser peach tree borer
- Longhorn date stem borer
- Marbled orchard tortrix
- Mediterranean fruit fly
- Mediterranean pine engraver beetle
- Melon fly
- Northern bark beetle
- Nun moth
- Olive fruit fly
- Olive moth
- Orange tortrix
- Oriental fruit fly
- Oriental fruit moth
- Pea moth
- Peach fruit fly
- Pear leaf blister moth
- Pear twig borer
- Pine processionary moth
- Pine sawfly
- Pink bollworm
- Plum fruit moth
- Potato moth
- Potato tuber moth
- Queensland fruit fly
- Quince moth
- Red palm weevil
- Rhinoceros beetle
- Rice stem borer
- Rose tortrix
- San Jose scale
- Sesiidae (some)
- Silver Y moth
- Six-spined spruce bark beetle
- Six-toothed bark beetle
- Spiny boll worm
- Spongy moth
- Spotted bollworm
- Spotted tentiform miner
- Straw coloured tortrix moth
- Sugar beet weevil
- Summer fruit tortrix moth
- Tobacco budworm
- Tomato leaf miner
- Tomato looper
- Turnip moth
- Variegated golden tortrix
- Winter moth
- Xyloterus bark beetle

== Gallery ==
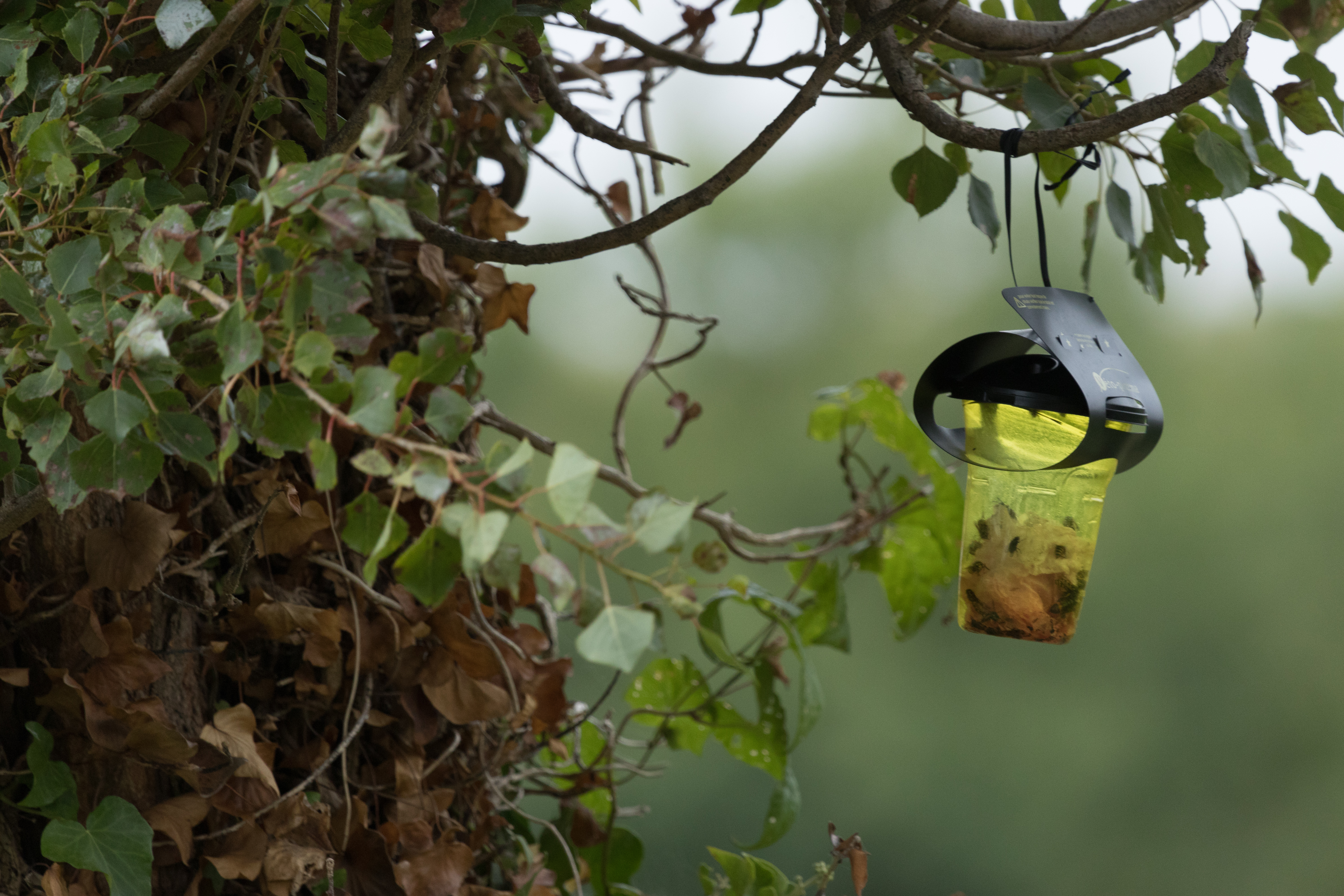

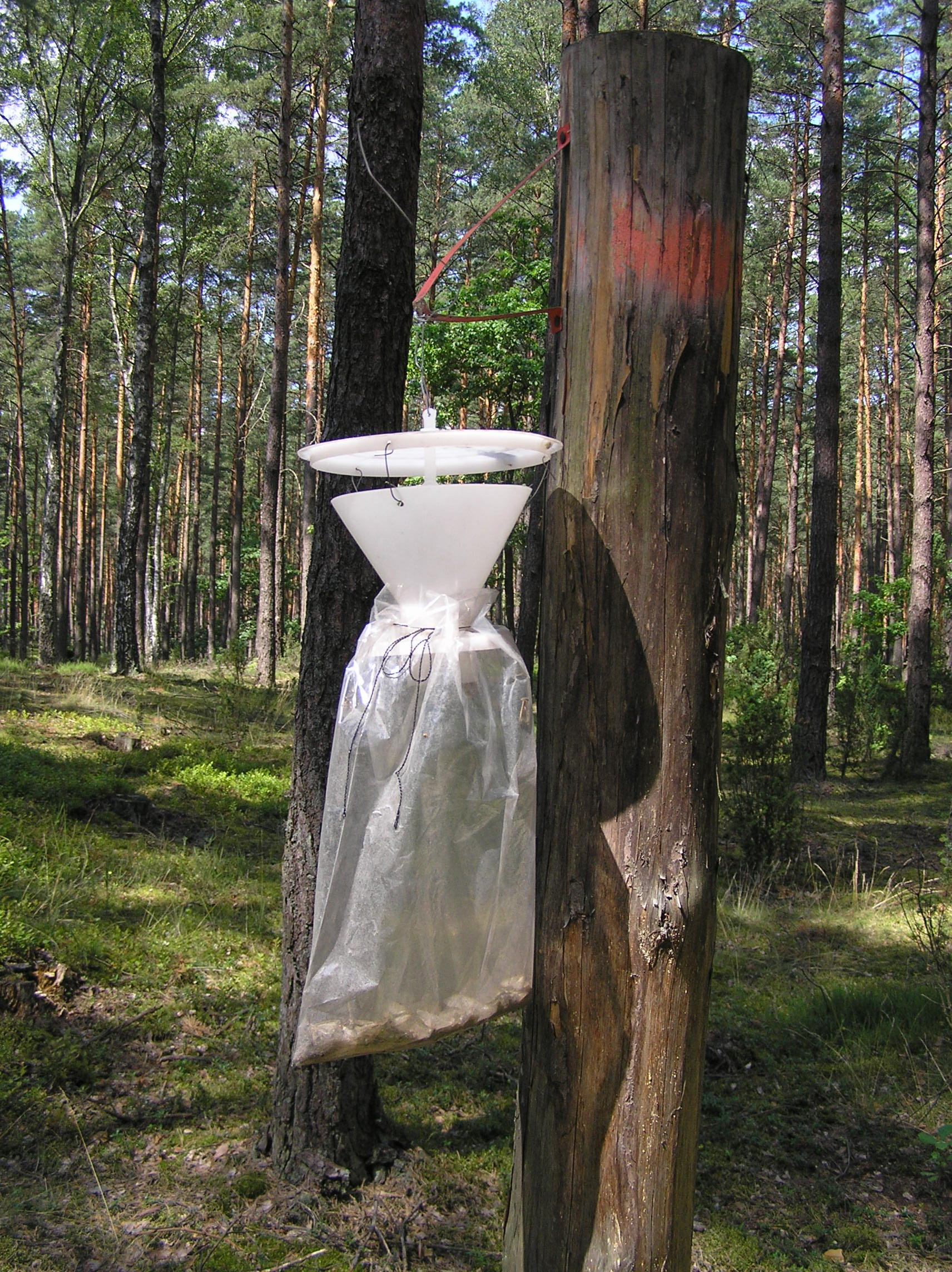

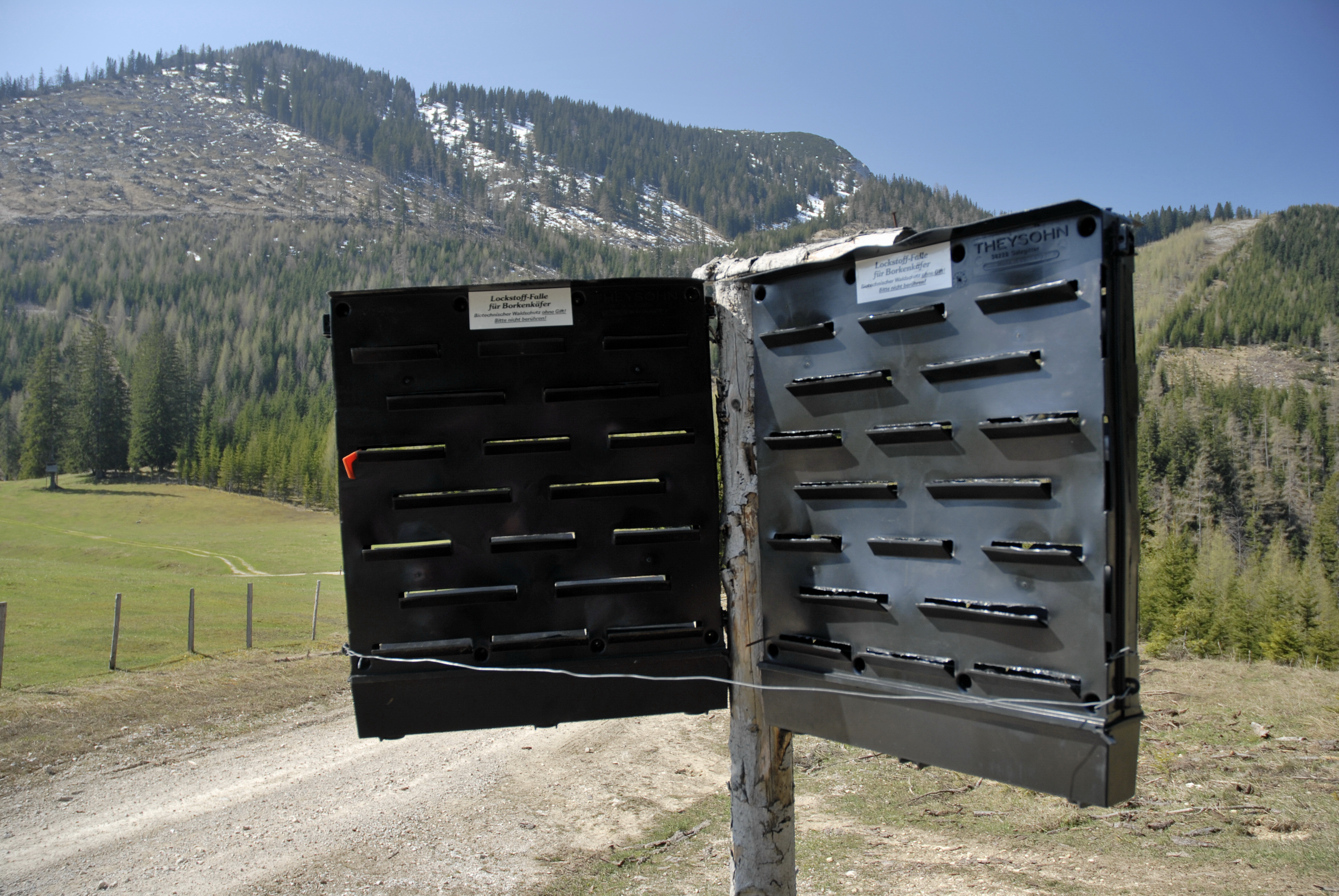

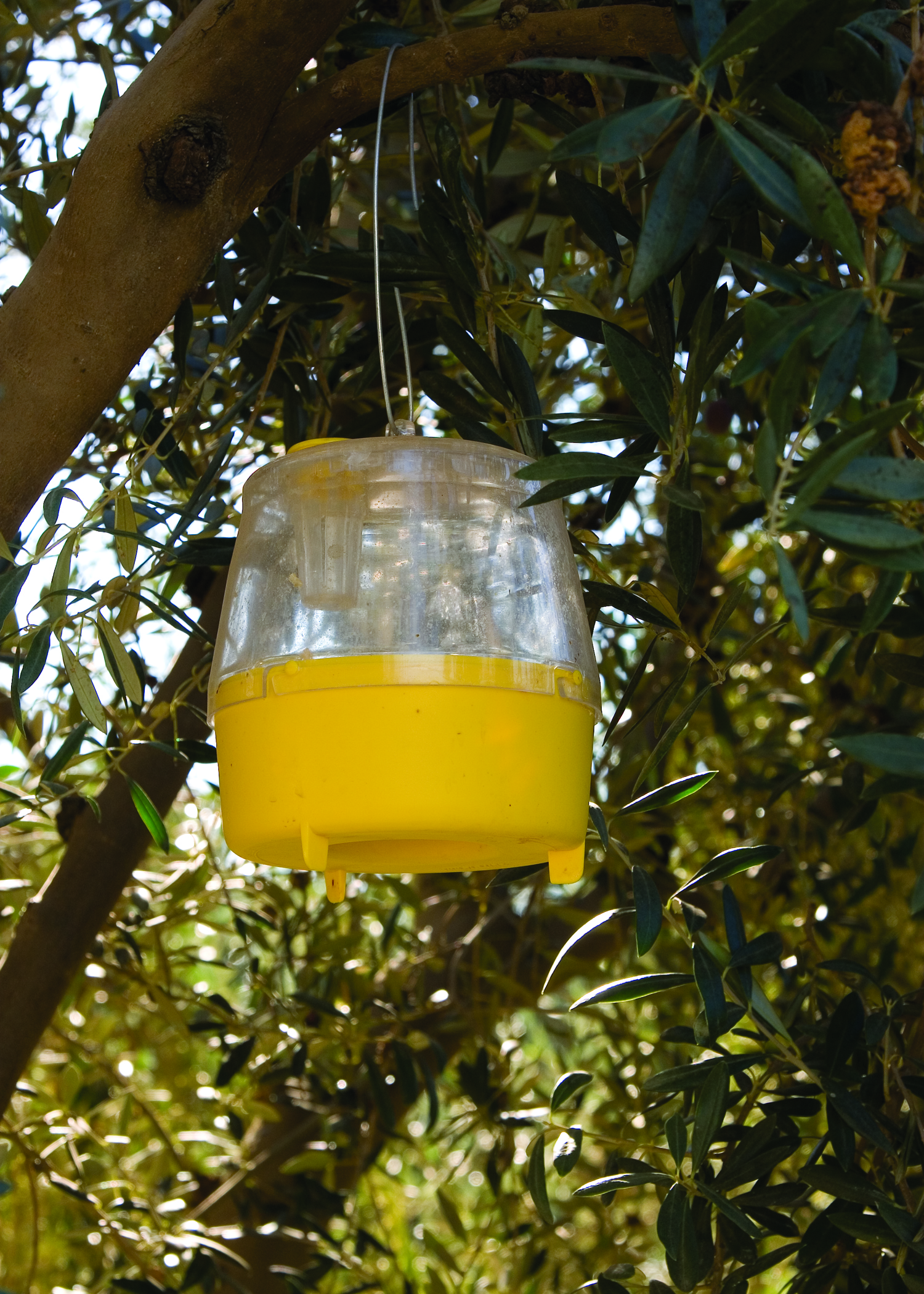

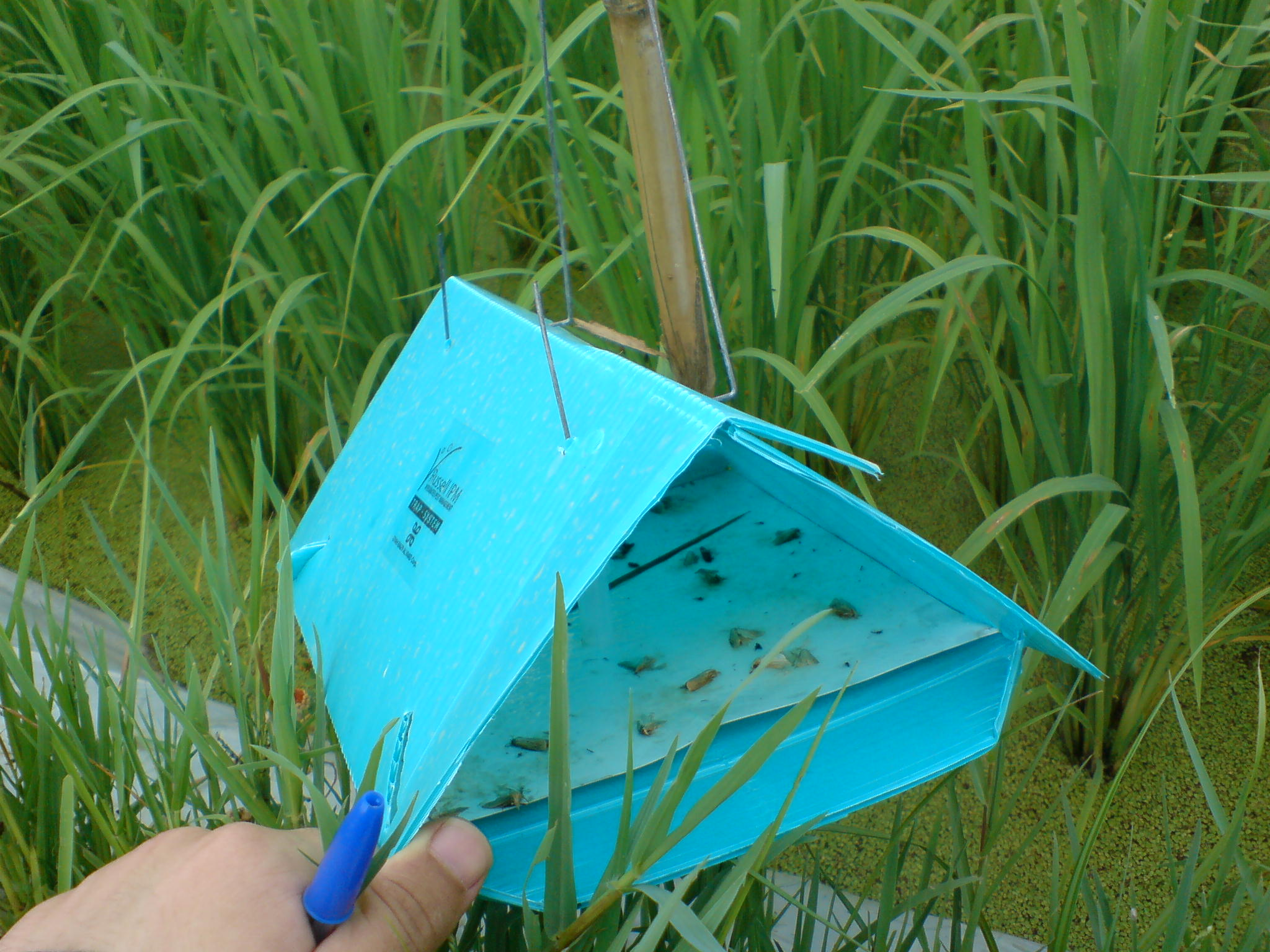

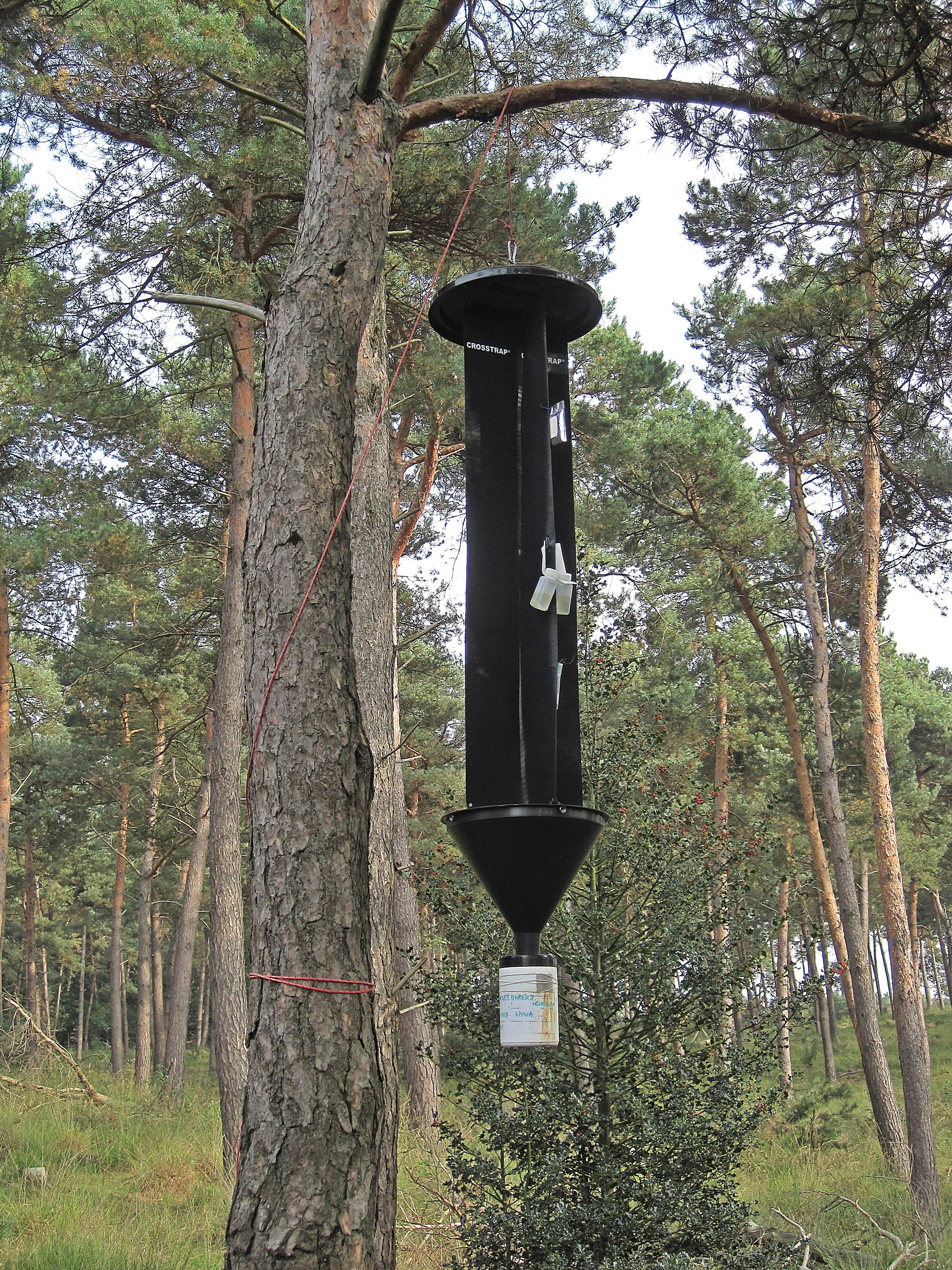

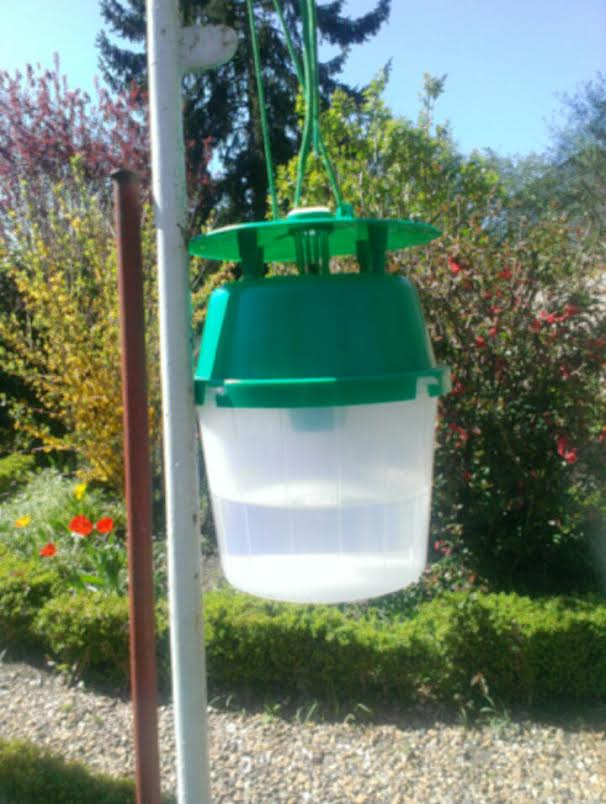

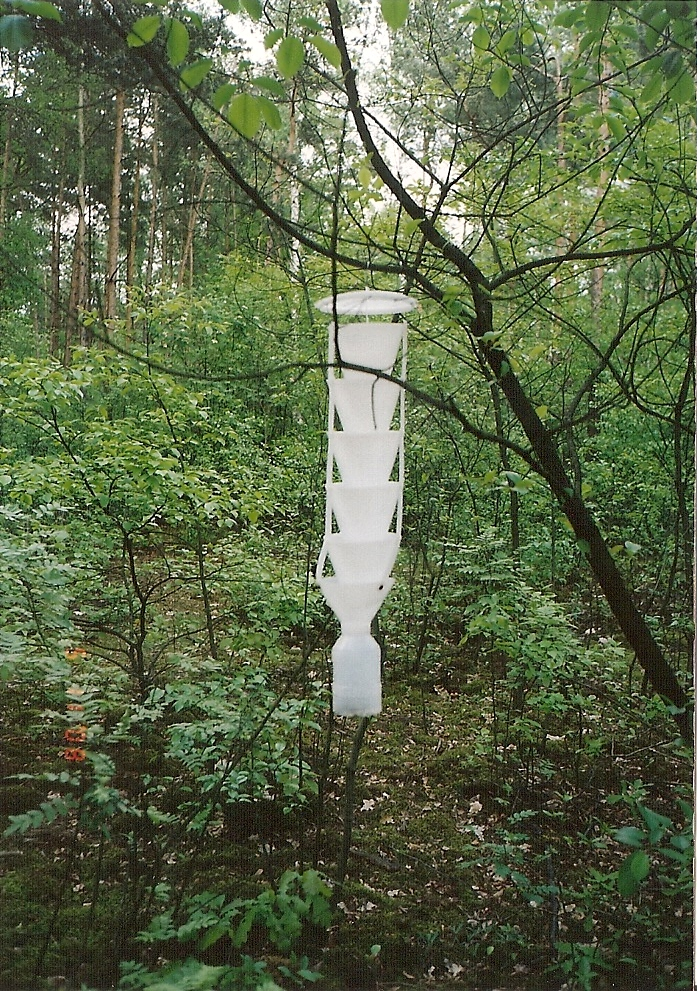

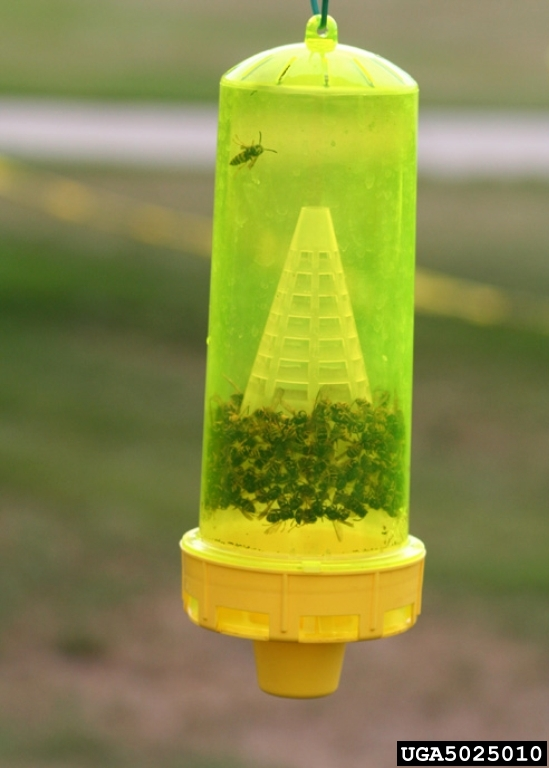
