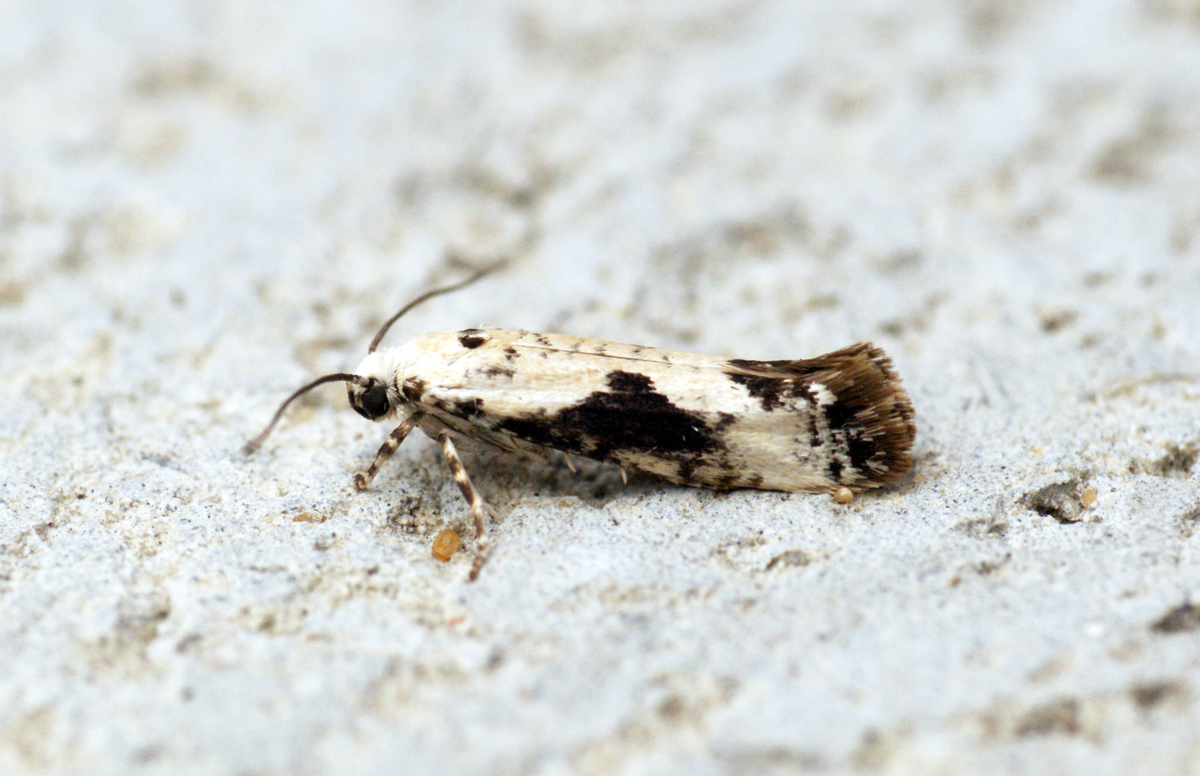

Scientific classification
- Kingdom: Animalia
- Phylum: Arthropoda
- Class: Insecta
- Order: Lepidoptera
- Family: Praydidae
- Genus: Prays
- Species: P. fraxinella

Binomial name
- Prays fraxinella Bjerkander, 1784

Synonyms
- List: Tinea fraxinella; Phalaena curtisella; Prays curtisellus; Prays curtisella (Donovan, 1793)

= Prays fraxinella =

Ash bud moth

Species of moth

Prays fraxinella, also known as the ash bud moth, is a moth of the family Plutellidae found in Europe. The larvae are leaf miners, feeding on the leaves and buds of ash trees.

== Description ==
The wingspan is 14–18 mm. The head is white or greyish ochreous. Forewings are white or greyish-ochreous; some blackish dorsal strigulae; a triangular blackish blotch, lighter or mixed with whitish on costa, extending along costa from near base to 2/3; some irregular blackish marks towards termen; sometimes the whole wing is unicolorous dark fuscous. Hind wings are rather dark grey. The larva is greenish, marbled with red -brown above; dorsal line deep green; head pale brown, dark-spotted; 2 with two black spots.

Adults are on wing from May to June and again in August in two generations depending on the location.

Prays fraxinella has two colour forms, the typical white and black colouration and the melanic form f.rustica.

Recently, the form f.rustica, that has an orange head has been separated into an entirely new species, Prays ruficeps.

Ovum

Eggs are laid on the twigs of ash (Fraxinus excelsior) and manna ash (Fraxinus ornus) in June and July.

Larva

When fully fed the larvae are 12 mm long and the body is greenish, with the head brown with black spots. As a juvenile leaf miner, the body is yellowish with a black head and anal plate, and as a bark miner the body is whitish.

Pupa

The larvae pupate in an open network cocoon and can be found in May or June.

== Gallery ==
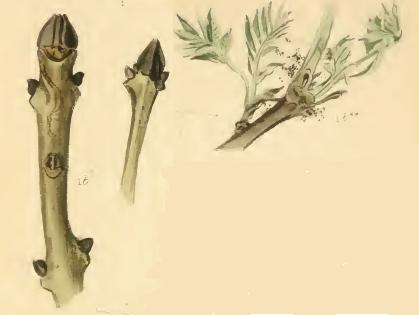
Ash leaflet mined by the young larva (1b); ash twigs beneath the bark of which the larva has burrowed (1b*) and an ash shoot eaten by the adult larva (1b**)

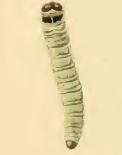
Young larva

Old larva

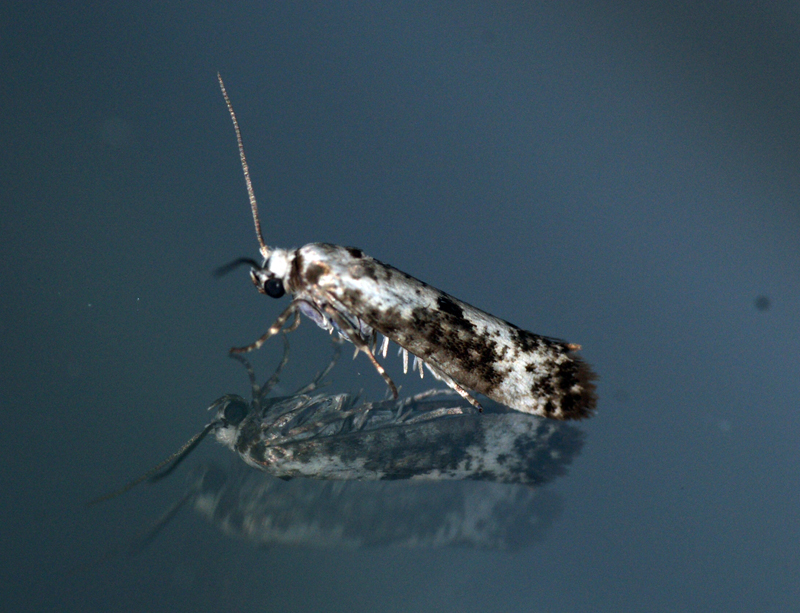

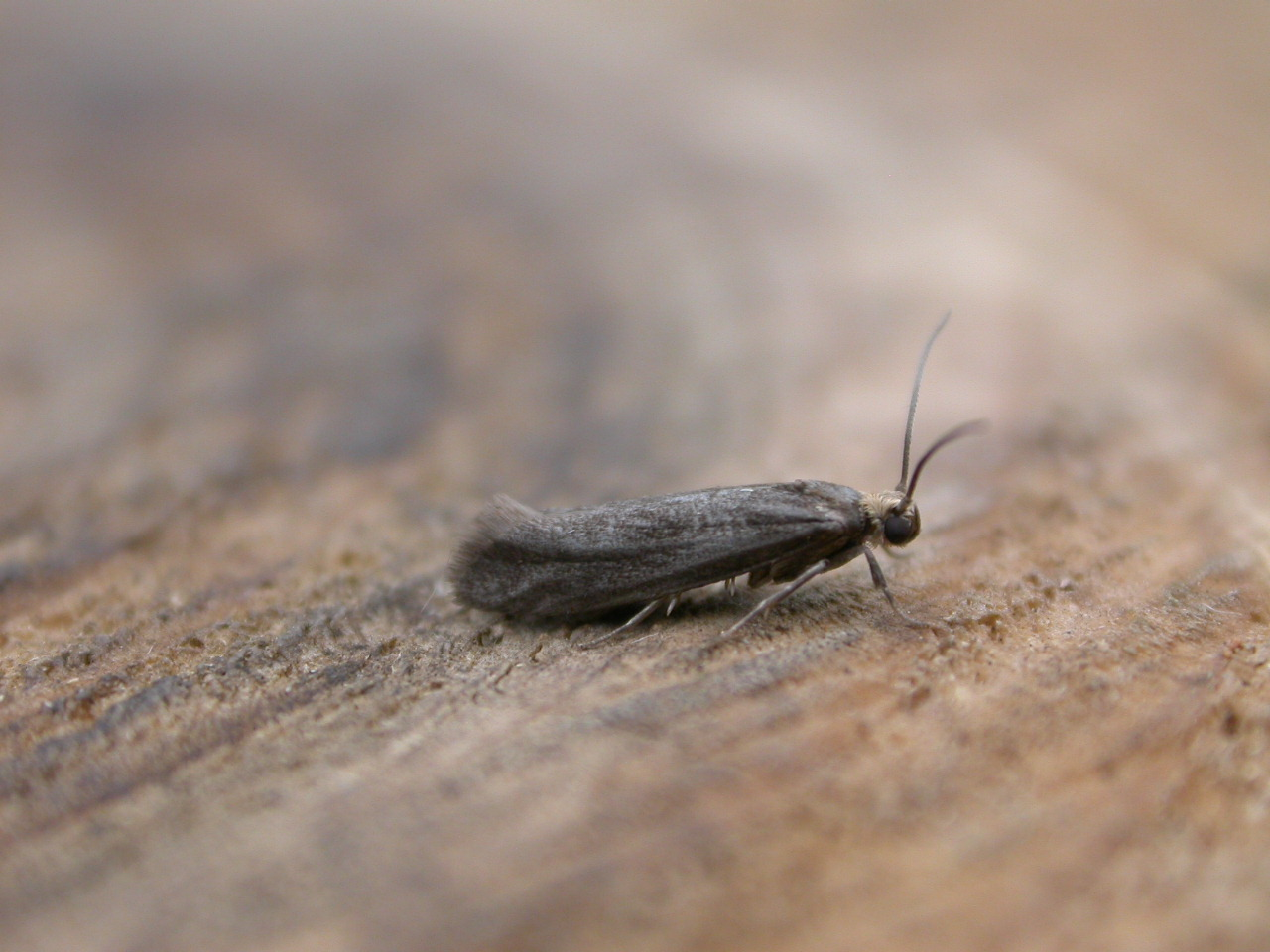

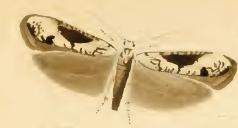
