= Prays citri =

Scientific classification
- Kingdom: Animalia
- Phylum: Arthropoda
- Clade: Pancrustacea
- Class: Insecta
- Order: Lepidoptera
- Family: Praydidae
- Genus: Prays
- Species: P. citri

Binomial name
- Prays citri https://www.cabidigitallibrary.org/doi/10.1079/cabicompendium.43910

Species of moth

Prays citri, also known by the common name citrus flower moth, is a Lepidoptera belonging to the family Yponomeutidae and is a pest of Citrus. Adult P. citri have light grey forewings with dark grey/black spots and greyish brown hindwings and body. They have hair-like structures (fringe) on the perimeter of their wings and a wingspan of 11.5–14.6 mm. Females tend to be lighter in colour than males. But an examination of genital structures is necessary to correctly identify P. citri from other species of the Prays genus.

== Reproduction, oviposition, and life cycle ==
Adult female P. citri release a pheromone, identified as (Z)-7-tetradecenal, to attract male moths. Once the moths have copulated, the female lays fertilized eggs after 2–5 hours. She lays between 60 and 156 eggs on the flower of a citrus tree. The eggs will hatch after 3–4 days, and larvae will emerge, lasting for around 12 days. After this, the larvae pupate and form a cocoon on the Citrus tree, and after about 6 days, a moth will emerge. The P. citri life cycle is anywhere from 17 to 25 days. The exact number of days of each developmental stage and the number of eggs laid are highly dependent on temperature. P. citri can have between 3 and 16 generations per year.

The idea temperature range for this species is between 25 °C and 30 °C, and if temperatures drop to 10 °C or below larvae cannot develop.

Experiments by Sternlicht (1974a) show that female P. citri prefer to oviposit based on the scent of certain Citrus, the shape of a surface, and show a preference to specific colours and light intensities. Generally, they prefer a convex surface with higher light intensity (300–350 lux), and blue, yellow, or white surfaces. The colour preference is likely do to the fact that these are the colour of lemon flowers.

Other research by Sternlicht (1974b) shows that males (2–6 days old) show the greatest attraction to females 1–16 hours hold. The number of days a male finds a female attractive also varies between seasons, with females being attractive for up to twice as many days in the winter seasons.

== Distribution ==
P. citri can be found in several African, Asian, and European countries. As well as in Australia, Fiji, New Zealand, and Samoa. An up to date listing of P. citri distribution can be found on CABI Compendium.

These pests can be spread by the movement of plants and fruits. They can also be transported on things like clothing, mail, and vehicles.

== Habitat and Diet ==
The preferred host plant of this P. citri is key (sweet) lime (Citrus aurantifolia). However, other susceptible hosts include a variety of Citrus trees, including lime, lemon, sweet orange, and navel orange. Less susceptible host plants include grapefruit, sour orange, and mandarin. The chemical compounds released by these different citrus plants (i.e., their smell) can be picked up by the moths, and the female moths will choose to lay their eggs on plants based on this property.

Because P. citri only feed different Citrus species, they are considered oligophagous. They can feed on the flowers, flower buds, fruit, and leaves of these trees.

== Natural Enemies ==
P. citri have a couple natural enemies including a pathogens, two parasites (Ageniaspis fuscicollis and Nemorilla maculosa), and a predator (Metaseiulus occidentalis). In the wild these parasites and predator have not shown to effectively control the population.

== Damage and Pest Control ==
P. citri is a significant pest to Citrus, reducing crop yields by up to 30%–40%, and are therefore economically costly. When the larvae emerge from their egg, they feed on the flower causing significant loss in fruit production.

Managing these insects is of prime importance to researchers, which can be done through a couple of mechanisms.

=== Insecticides ===
Insecticides can come in different forms, including chemical, bacterial, and fungal insecticides. But generally, these all have a similar function to reduce the population.

In the lab, scientists are looking at exploiting the natural pathogens to control the population. Beauveria bassiana (product name Bactospeine) is being tested on P. citri as a fungal insecticide. Bacillus thuringiensis (product name Bio-fly) is used as a bacterial insecticide on P. citri. In the laboratory, researchers found both of these insecticides reduce the lifespan of the moths, reduce the oviposition period, and number of eggs laid by females. When applied in the field, the number of larvae infecting flowers was significantly reduced. However, the bacterial insecticide was shown to be more effective in controlling the population compared to the fungal insecticide.

Chemical insecticides, such as chlorpyriphos, have also been used.

=== Pheromone Traps and Male Mass Trapping ===
The female sex pheromone (Z)-7-tetradecenal can be synthesized in the lab to use in pheromone traps. Pheromone traps work by attracting organisms with a pheromone and then using some means of trapping them. In field studies with P. citri, this pheromone can be applied to a sticky trap to capture males. Male mass trapping aims to trap the males of a species; therefore, fewer females are fertilized, and the number of moths in the generation will be reduced. These traps have also proved an effective method of population control.
