= Prays gamma =

Scientific classification
- Kingdom: Animalia
- Phylum: Arthropoda
- Class: Insecta
- Order: Lepidoptera
- Family: Praydidae
- Genus: Prays
- Species: P. gamma

Binomial name
- Prays gamma Moriuti, 1977

Species of moth

Prays gamma is a moth of the family Plutellidae. It is found in Japan.

The wingspan is about 14 mm.
