= Prays temulenta =

Scientific classification
- Kingdom: Animalia
- Phylum: Arthropoda
- Class: Insecta
- Order: Lepidoptera
- Family: Praydidae
- Genus: Prays
- Species: P. temulenta

Binomial name
- Prays temulenta Meyrick, 1910

Species of moth

Prays temulenta is a moth in the family Plutellidae.
