= Prays xeroloxa =

Scientific classification
- Domain: Eukaryota
- Kingdom: Animalia
- Phylum: Arthropoda
- Class: Insecta
- Order: Lepidoptera
- Family: Praydidae
- Genus: Prays
- Species: P. xeroloxa

Binomial name
- Prays xeroloxa Meyrick, 1935

Species of moth

Prays xeroloxa is a species of moth in the family Praydidae. It was described by English entomologist Edward Meyrick in 1935 based on larvae collected from the island of Java and reared on Harrisonia leaves.
