= Prays tineiformis =

Scientific classification
- Kingdom: Animalia
- Phylum: Arthropoda
- Clade: Pancrustacea
- Class: Insecta
- Order: Lepidoptera
- Family: Praydidae
- Genus: Prays
- Species: P. tineiformis

Binomial name
- Prays tineiformis J.C. Sohn & C.S. Wu, 2011

Species of moth

Prays tineiformis is a moth of the family Plutellidae. It is found in Hainan, China.
