= Prays stratella =

Scientific classification
- Kingdom: Animalia
- Phylum: Arthropoda
- Clade: Pancrustacea
- Class: Insecta
- Order: Lepidoptera
- Family: Praydidae
- Genus: Prays
- Species: P. stratella

Binomial name
- Prays stratella Zeller, 1877

Species of moth

Prays stratella is a moth in the family Plutellidae.
