= Prays alpha =

Scientific classification
- Kingdom: Animalia
- Phylum: Arthropoda
- Class: Insecta
- Order: Lepidoptera
- Family: Praydidae
- Genus: Prays
- Species: P. alpha

Binomial name
- Prays alpha Moriuti, 1977

Species of moth

Prays alpha is a moth of the family Plutellidae. It is found in Japan (including Hokkaido island) and has also been recorded from China.

The wingspan is 11–16 mm.
