= Prays sublevatella =

Scientific classification
- Kingdom: Animalia
- Phylum: Arthropoda
- Class: Insecta
- Order: Lepidoptera
- Family: Praydidae
- Genus: Prays
- Species: P. sublevatella

Binomial name
- Prays sublevatella Viette, 1957

Species of moth

Prays sublevatella is a moth in the family Plutellidae. It is found on Réunion island in the Indian Ocean.

This species has a wingspan of 15 mm and a wing length of 7 mm.

Its host plant is Olea lancea (Oleaceae).
