= Prays kappa =

Scientific classification
- Kingdom: Animalia
- Phylum: Arthropoda
- Class: Insecta
- Order: Lepidoptera
- Family: Praydidae
- Genus: Prays
- Species: P. kappa

Binomial name
- Prays kappa Moriuti, 1977

Species of moth

Prays kappa is a moth of the family Plutellidae. It is found in Japan.

The wingspan is about 12 mm.
