= Prays peperitis =

Scientific classification
- Domain: Eukaryota
- Kingdom: Animalia
- Phylum: Arthropoda
- Class: Insecta
- Order: Lepidoptera
- Family: Praydidae
- Genus: Prays
- Species: P. peperitis

Binomial name
- Prays peperitis Meyrick, 1907

Species of moth

Prays peperitis is a species of moth in the family of Praydidae. It was first described by the English entomologist, Edward Meyrick in 1907, based on seven specimens collected in Sri Lanka.
