= Prays peregrina =

Scientific classification
- Kingdom: Animalia
- Phylum: Arthropoda
- Class: Insecta
- Order: Lepidoptera
- Family: Praydidae
- Genus: Prays
- Species: P. peregrina

Binomial name
- Prays peregrina Agassiz, 2007

Species of moth

Prays peregrina is a moth of the family Plutellidae. It was first discovered in North London in 2003, and subsequently in the Chelsea Physic Garden, West London in 2005. Since then there have been a number of records in the London and Kent area. Although it is only known from Great Britain, the species is thought to be native to Asia and was imported with food or plants from that region.

The wingspan is about 14 mm.

Leafmining caterpillars of this species were found on Ruta chalpensis in October 2016 in Bishops Stortford, Hertfordshire.
