= Tewson =

Tewson is a surname. Notable people with the surname include:

- Jane Tewson (born 1958), British charity worker
- Josephine Tewson (1931–2022), British actress
- Vincent Tewson (1898–1981), British trade unionist

== See also ==
- Newson
