= Prays autocasis =

Scientific classification
- Kingdom: Animalia
- Phylum: Arthropoda
- Class: Insecta
- Order: Lepidoptera
- Family: Praydidae
- Genus: Prays
- Species: P. autocasis

Binomial name
- Prays autocasis Meyrick, 1907

Species of moth

Prays autocasis is a moth of the family Praydidae. It is found in Australia.
