= Prays kalligraphos =

Scientific classification
- Kingdom: Animalia
- Phylum: Arthropoda
- Clade: Pancrustacea
- Class: Insecta
- Order: Lepidoptera
- Family: Praydidae
- Genus: Prays
- Species: P. kalligraphos

Binomial name
- Prays kalligraphos J.C. Sohn & C.S. Wu, 2011

Species of moth

Prays kalligraphos is a moth of the family Plutellidae. It is found in Sichuan, China.
