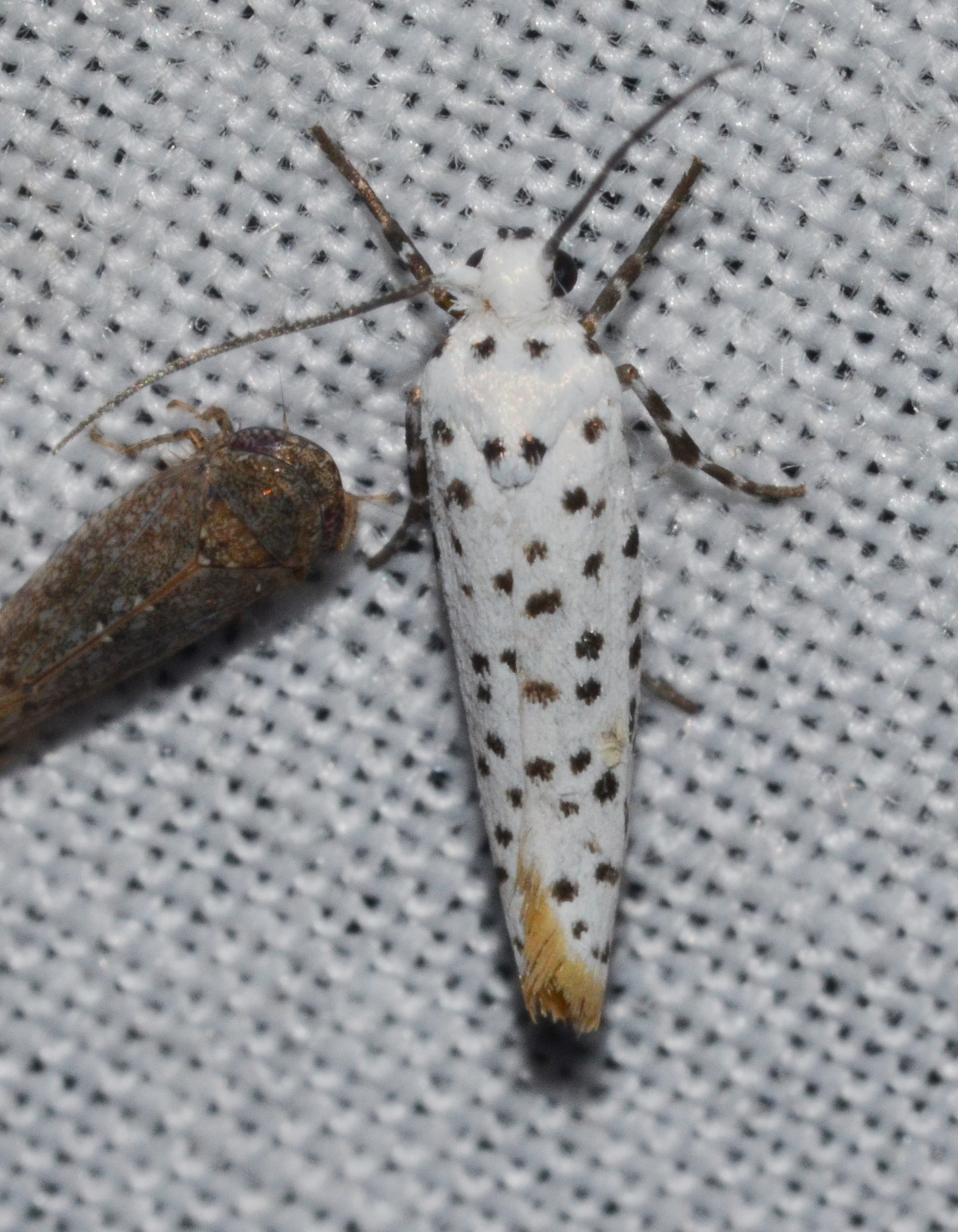

Scientific classification
- Kingdom: Animalia
- Phylum: Arthropoda
- Class: Insecta
- Order: Lepidoptera
- Family: Praydidae
- Genus: Prays
- Species: P. atomocella

Binomial name
- Prays atomocella (Dyar, 1902)

Synonyms
- Yponomeuta atomocella Dyar, 1902; Yponomeuta atomosella; Prays atomosella

= Prays atomocella =

Hop-tree ermine moth

Species of moth

Prays atomocella, the hop-tree ermine moth, is a moth of the family Plutellidae. It is found in the United States, where it has been recorded from Arkansas, Illinois, Indiana, Kentucky, Michigan, New Mexico, Ohio, Tennessee and Texas.

The wingspan is about 18 mm. There is one generation per year with adults on wing from April to August.

The larvae feed inside new shoots of Ptelea trifoliata. When full-grown, the larva leaves the shoot and pupates inside a cocoon. Larvae can be found in early spring.
