= Prays friesei =

Scientific classification
- Kingdom: Animalia
- Phylum: Arthropoda
- Clade: Pancrustacea
- Class: Insecta
- Order: Lepidoptera
- Family: Praydidae
- Genus: Prays
- Species: P. friesei

Binomial name
- Prays friesei Klimesch, 1992

Species of moth

Prays friesei is a species of moth in the family Praydidae. It is found on the Canary Islands and Madeira. The larvae feed on Chrysojasminum odoratissimum and Picconia excelsa.
