= Prays inscripta =

Scientific classification
- Domain: Eukaryota
- Kingdom: Animalia
- Phylum: Arthropoda
- Class: Insecta
- Order: Lepidoptera
- Family: Praydidae
- Genus: Prays
- Species: P. inscripta

Binomial name
- Prays inscripta Meyrick, 1907

Species of moth

Prays inscripta is a species of moth in the family Praydidae. It was described by Edward Meyrick in 1907 and is found in Australia. The larvae feed on Phebalium plants.
