= John Newsome =

John Newsome may refer to:

- John P. Newsome (1893–1961), politician in the U.S. state of Alabama
- John R. Newsome (fl. 2000s), politician in the U.S. state of Colorado

== See also ==
- John Newsom, American painter
- Jon Newsome, English footballer
