= Prays ducalis =

Scientific classification
- Domain: Eukaryota
- Kingdom: Animalia
- Phylum: Arthropoda
- Class: Insecta
- Order: Lepidoptera
- Family: Praydidae
- Genus: Prays
- Species: P. ducalis

Binomial name
- Prays ducalis Meyrick, 1914

Species of moth

Prays ducalis is a species of moth in the family Praydidae. It was described by English entomologist Edward Meyrick in 1914 based a single specimen collected in Sri Lanka.
