= Prays fulvocanella =

Scientific classification
- Domain: Eukaryota
- Kingdom: Animalia
- Phylum: Arthropoda
- Class: Insecta
- Order: Lepidoptera
- Family: Praydidae
- Genus: Prays
- Species: P. fulvocanella

Binomial name
- Prays fulvocanella Walsingham, 1907

Synonyms
- Prays fulvocanellus Walsingham, 1907

Species of moth

Prays fulvocanella is a species of moth in the family Praydidae. It is endemic to the Hawaiian island of Kauai. Species of Melicope and Zanthoxylum may serve as hosts for P. fulvocanella larvae.
