= Prays erebitis =

Scientific classification
- Domain: Eukaryota
- Kingdom: Animalia
- Phylum: Arthropoda
- Class: Insecta
- Order: Lepidoptera
- Family: Praydidae
- Genus: Prays
- Species: P. erebitis

Binomial name
- Prays erebitis Meyrick, 1914

Species of moth

Prays erebitis is a species of moth in the family Praydidae. It was described by English entomologist Edward Meyrick in 1914 based on two specimens collected in Ootacamund, India.
