= Prays delta =

Scientific classification
- Kingdom: Animalia
- Phylum: Arthropoda
- Class: Insecta
- Order: Lepidoptera
- Family: Praydidae
- Genus: Prays
- Species: P. delta

Binomial name
- Prays delta Moriuti, 1977

Species of moth

Prays delta is a moth of the family Plutellidae. It is found on the island of Honshu in Japan and has also been recorded from China.

The wingspan is 12–13 mm.
