= Prays acmonias =

Scientific classification
- Kingdom: Animalia
- Phylum: Arthropoda
- Class: Insecta
- Order: Lepidoptera
- Family: Praydidae
- Genus: Prays
- Species: P. acmonias

Binomial name
- Prays acmonias Meyrick, 1914

Species of moth

Prays acmonias is a moth of the family Plutellidae. It is found in Pakistan.

The larvae feed on Viburnum species.
