= Prays endolemma =

Scientific classification
- Domain: Eukaryota
- Kingdom: Animalia
- Phylum: Arthropoda
- Class: Insecta
- Order: Lepidoptera
- Family: Praydidae
- Genus: Prays
- Species: P. endolemma

Binomial name
- Prays endolemma Diakonoff, 1967

Species of moth

Prays endolemma is a species of moth in the family Praydidae. It was described by Alexey Diakonoff in 1967 and is found on the island of Luzon in the Philippines.
