= Prays inconspicua =

Scientific classification
- Domain: Eukaryota
- Kingdom: Animalia
- Phylum: Arthropoda
- Class: Insecta
- Order: Lepidoptera
- Family: Praydidae
- Genus: Prays
- Species: P. inconspicua

Binomial name
- Prays inconspicua H.L. Yu & H.H. Li, 2004

Species of moth

Prays inconspicua is a moth of the family Plutellidae. It is found in Henan, China.
