= Prays caenobitella =

Scientific classification
- Kingdom: Animalia
- Phylum: Arthropoda
- Clade: Pancrustacea
- Class: Insecta
- Order: Lepidoptera
- Family: Praydidae
- Genus: Prays
- Species: P. caenobitella

Binomial name
- Prays caenobitella Hübner 1816

Species of moth

Prays caenobitella is a moth in the family Plutellidae.
