= Prays endocarpa =

Scientific classification
- Kingdom: Animalia
- Phylum: Arthropoda
- Class: Insecta
- Order: Lepidoptera
- Family: Praydidae
- Genus: Prays
- Species: P. endocarpa

Binomial name
- Prays endocarpa Meyrick, 1919

Species of moth

Prays endocarpa is a moth in the family Plutellidae.Known by the common name Citrus pock caterpillar, the larvae are pests of Pomelo fruit.
