= Prays lambda =

Scientific classification
- Kingdom: Animalia
- Phylum: Arthropoda
- Class: Insecta
- Order: Lepidoptera
- Family: Praydidae
- Genus: Prays
- Species: P. lambda

Binomial name
- Prays lambda Moriuti, 1977

Species of moth

Prays lambda is a moth of the family Plutellidae. It is found in Japan.

The wingspan is 11–14 mm.
