= Prays curalis =

Scientific classification
- Kingdom: Animalia
- Phylum: Arthropoda
- Class: Insecta
- Order: Lepidoptera
- Family: Praydidae
- Genus: Prays
- Species: P. curalis

Binomial name
- Prays curalis Meyrick, 1914

Species of moth

Prays curalis is a moth of the family Praydidae.
