= Prays curulis =

Scientific classification
- Kingdom: Animalia
- Phylum: Arthropoda
- Class: Insecta
- Order: Lepidoptera
- Family: Praydidae
- Genus: Prays
- Species: P. curulis

Binomial name
- Prays curulis Meyrick, 1914

Species of moth

Prays curulis is a moth in the family Plutellidae. It is found in Nepal and northern India.
