= Prays lobata =

Scientific classification
- Domain: Eukaryota
- Kingdom: Animalia
- Phylum: Arthropoda
- Class: Insecta
- Order: Lepidoptera
- Family: Praydidae
- Genus: Prays
- Species: P. lobata

Binomial name
- Prays lobata H.L. Yu & H.H. Li, 2004

Species of moth

Prays lobata is a moth of the family Plutellidae. It is found in Hubei, China.
