= Newsom =

Newsom is a surname of English origin which is a variant of the surname Newsome.

== People ==
- Bobo Newsom (1907–1962), American baseball player
- Carroll Vincent Newsom (1904–1990), American former president of New York University
- Christopher Newsom (1983–2007), American victim of a kidnapping and murder
- David Newsom (born 1962), American actor and photographer
- David Newsom (cricketer) (born 1937), English cricketer and Royal Navy officer
- David D. Newsom (1918–2008), U.S. Assistant Secretary of State for African Affairs (1969–1974)
- Eric D. Newsom (1943–2025), American diplomat and State Department official
- James Newsom, American politician
- Jerry Newsom (born 1946), American collegiate basketball player
- Lee Ann Newsom, Associate Professor of Anthropology at Penn State University
- Leo Dale Newsom (1915–1987), American entomologist
- Rick Newsom (1950–1988), NASCAR Winston Cup driver
- Tommy Newsom (1929–2007), American saxophone player in the NBC Orchestra on The Tonight Show Starring Johnny Carson
- Xavier Newsom, American football player

=== Newsom family of California ===
The Newsom family, originally from Canada, established an architecture practice in Oakland, California in the 1870s. Many members of the family became active as architects from this decade onward. Notable members of this family and their lineage include:

- Gavin Newsom (born 1967), American Democratic politician and Governor of California since 2019
- Jennifer Siebel Newsom (born 1974), American documentary filmmaker and First Lady of California since 2019
- Joanna Newsom (born 1982), American musician and songwriter
- Joseph Cather Newsom (1858–1930), Canadian-born American architect
- Samuel Newsom (1852–1908), Canadian-born American architect
- William Newsom (1933–2018), American state appeals court judge

== See also ==
- Newson, a surname and given name
