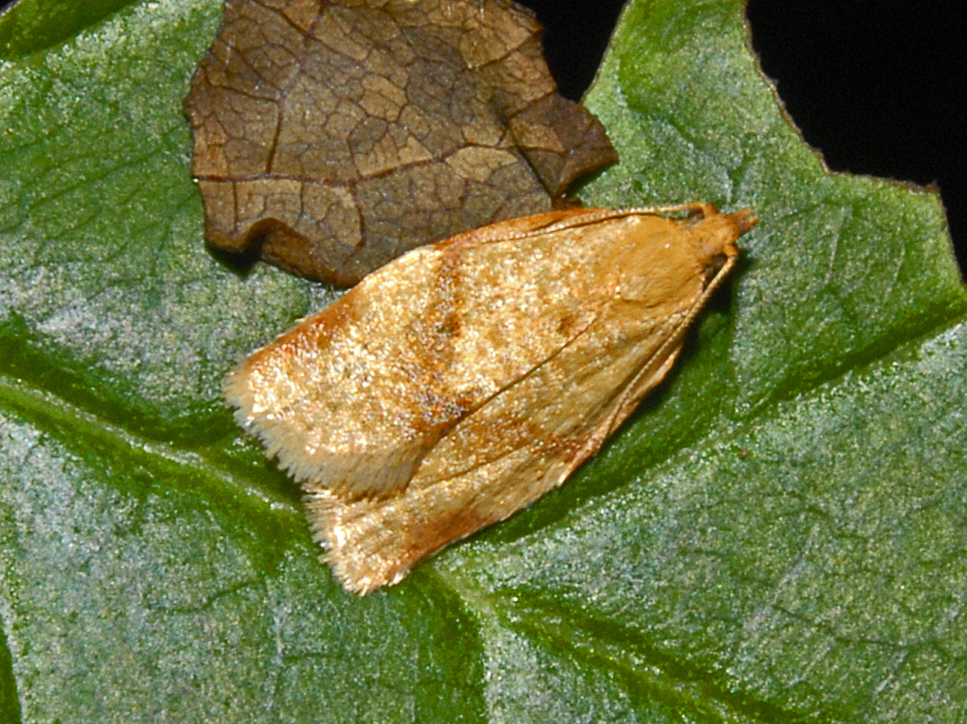

Scientific classification
- Domain: Eukaryota
- Kingdom: Animalia
- Phylum: Arthropoda
- Class: Insecta
- Order: Lepidoptera
- Family: Tortricidae
- Genus: Paramesia
- Species: P. gnomana

Binomial name
- Paramesia gnomana (Clerck, 1759)

Synonyms
- List: Paramesia costana Denis & Schiffermüller, 1775; Phalaena gnomana Clerck, 1759; Epagoge aetnana Zerny, 1943; Tortrix costana [Denis & Schiffermuller], 1775; Tortrix (Dichelia) diffusana Kennel, 1899; Tortrix livonana Sodoffsky, 1829; Epagoge montedorea Wehrli, 1925; Epagoge schawerdae ab. pouzatella Schawerda, 1929; Epagoge (Dichelia) schawerdae Rebel, 1926; Epagoge schawerdae ab. straminea Schawerda, 1929; Epagoge schawerdae ab. unicolor Rebel, 1926

= Paramesia gnomana =

Species of moth

Paramesia gnomana is a species of moth belonging to the family Tortricidae, first described by Carl Alexander Clerck in 1759.

== Description ==
Paramesia gnomana has a wingspan of about 16–20 millimetres (0.63–0.79 in). It is similar to Clepsis spectrana, but it is paler. These moths fly from June to August.

Caterpillars are polyphagous, feeding from May to June on a wide range of herbaceous plants, shrubs and trees, especially on bilberry (Vaccinium myrtillus), Stachys species, Iris species, plantain (Plantago species), and dandelion (Taraxacum species).

== Distribution and habitat ==
This species is present in most of Europe and in the Near East. It prefers dry grassland habitats.
