= Prays omicron =

Scientific classification
- Kingdom: Animalia
- Phylum: Arthropoda
- Class: Insecta
- Order: Lepidoptera
- Family: Praydidae
- Genus: Prays
- Species: P. omicron

Binomial name
- Prays omicron Moriuti, 1977

Species of moth

Prays omicron is a moth of the family Praydidae. It is found in Japan.

The wingspan is 9–11 mm.
