= Prays liophaea =

Scientific classification
- Domain: Eukaryota
- Kingdom: Animalia
- Phylum: Arthropoda
- Class: Insecta
- Order: Lepidoptera
- Family: Praydidae
- Genus: Prays
- Species: P. liophaea

Binomial name
- Prays liophaea Meyrick, 1927

Species of moth

Prays liophaea is a species of moth in the family Praydidae. It was described by English entomologist Edward Meyrick in 1927 based on two specimens collected from Stellenbosch, South Africa.
