= Prays chrysophyllae =

Scientific classification
- Domain: Eukaryota
- Kingdom: Animalia
- Phylum: Arthropoda
- Class: Insecta
- Order: Lepidoptera
- Family: Praydidae
- Genus: Prays
- Species: P. chrysophyllae

Binomial name
- Prays chrysophyllae Silvestri, 1915

Species of moth

Prays chrysophyllae is a species of moth in the family Praydidae. It was described by Italian entomologist Filippo Silvestri in 1915 and is known from Eritrea. The larvae feed on wild olive (Olea europaea subsp. cuspidata).
