= Prays amblystola =

Scientific classification
- Domain: Eukaryota
- Kingdom: Animalia
- Phylum: Arthropoda
- Class: Insecta
- Order: Lepidoptera
- Family: Praydidae
- Genus: Prays
- Species: P. amblystola

Binomial name
- Prays amblystola Turner, 1923

Species of moth

Prays amblystola is a species of moth in the family Praydidae. It was described by Alfred Jefferis Turner in 1923 and is found in New South Wales, Australia.
