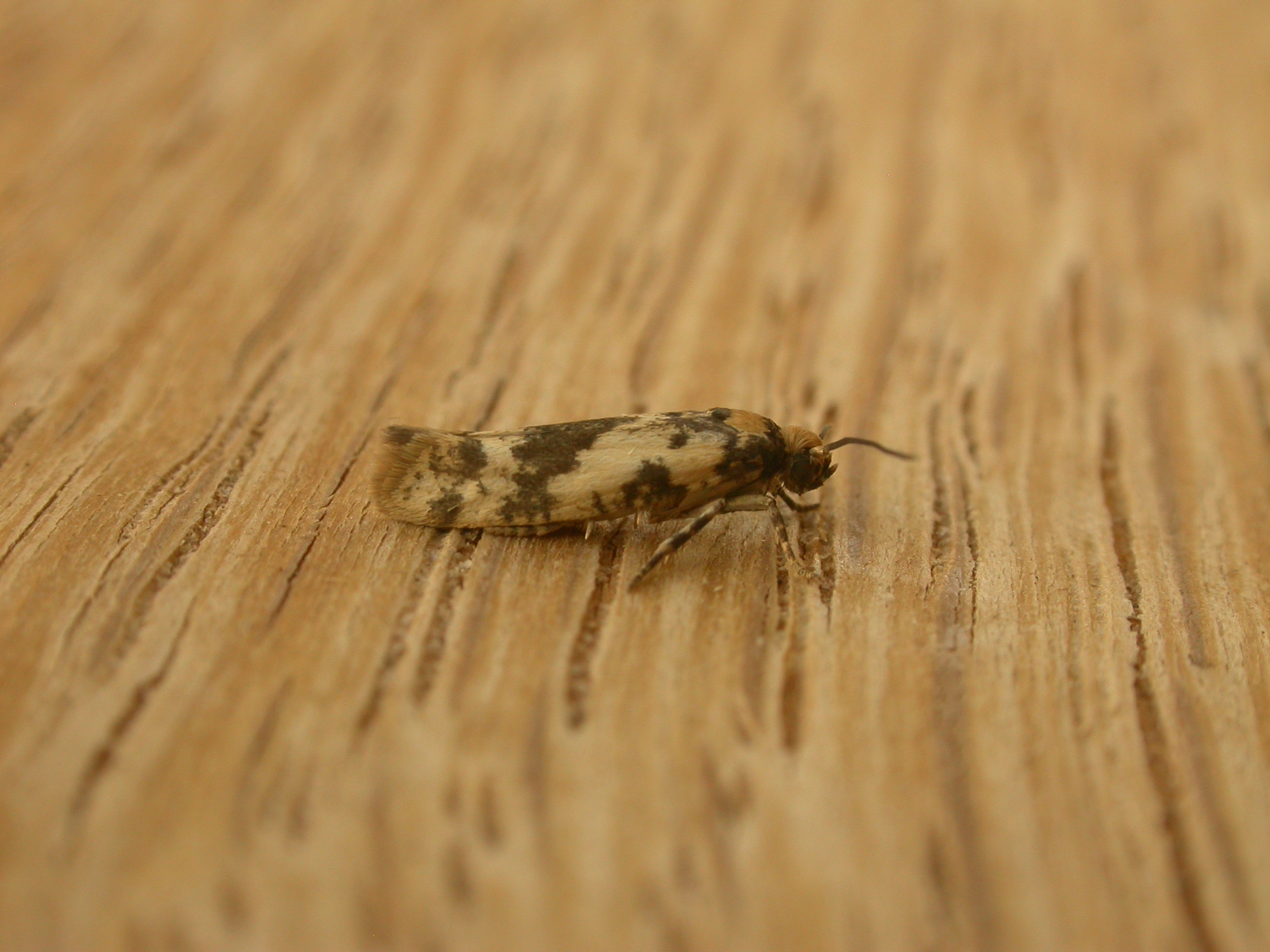

Scientific classification
- Kingdom: Animalia
- Phylum: Arthropoda
- Clade: Pancrustacea
- Class: Insecta
- Order: Lepidoptera
- Family: Praydidae
- Genus: Prays
- Species: P. parilis

Binomial name
- Prays parilis Turner, 1923

= Prays parilis =

Lemon bud moth

Species of moth

Prays parilis, the lemon bud moth, is a moth of the family Praydidae. The species was first described by Alfred Jefferis Turner in 1923. It is found in Australia (New South Wales and Queensland), New Zealand and the Cook Islands.
