= Prays sparsipunctella =

Scientific classification
- Domain: Eukaryota
- Kingdom: Animalia
- Phylum: Arthropoda
- Class: Insecta
- Order: Lepidoptera
- Family: Praydidae
- Genus: Prays
- Species: P. sparsipunctella

Binomial name
- Prays sparsipunctella Turati, 1924

Species of moth

Prays sparsipunctella is a species of moth in the family Praydidae. It was described by Italian entomologist Emilio Turati in 1924 and is known from Benghazi, Libya.
