= Prays tyrastis =

Scientific classification
- Kingdom: Animalia
- Phylum: Arthropoda
- Class: Insecta
- Order: Lepidoptera
- Family: Praydidae
- Genus: Prays
- Species: P. tyrastis

Binomial name
- Prays tyrastis Meyrick, 1907

Species of moth

Prays tyrastis is a moth of the family Plutellidae found in Australia. It was first described by Edward Meyrick in 1907.
