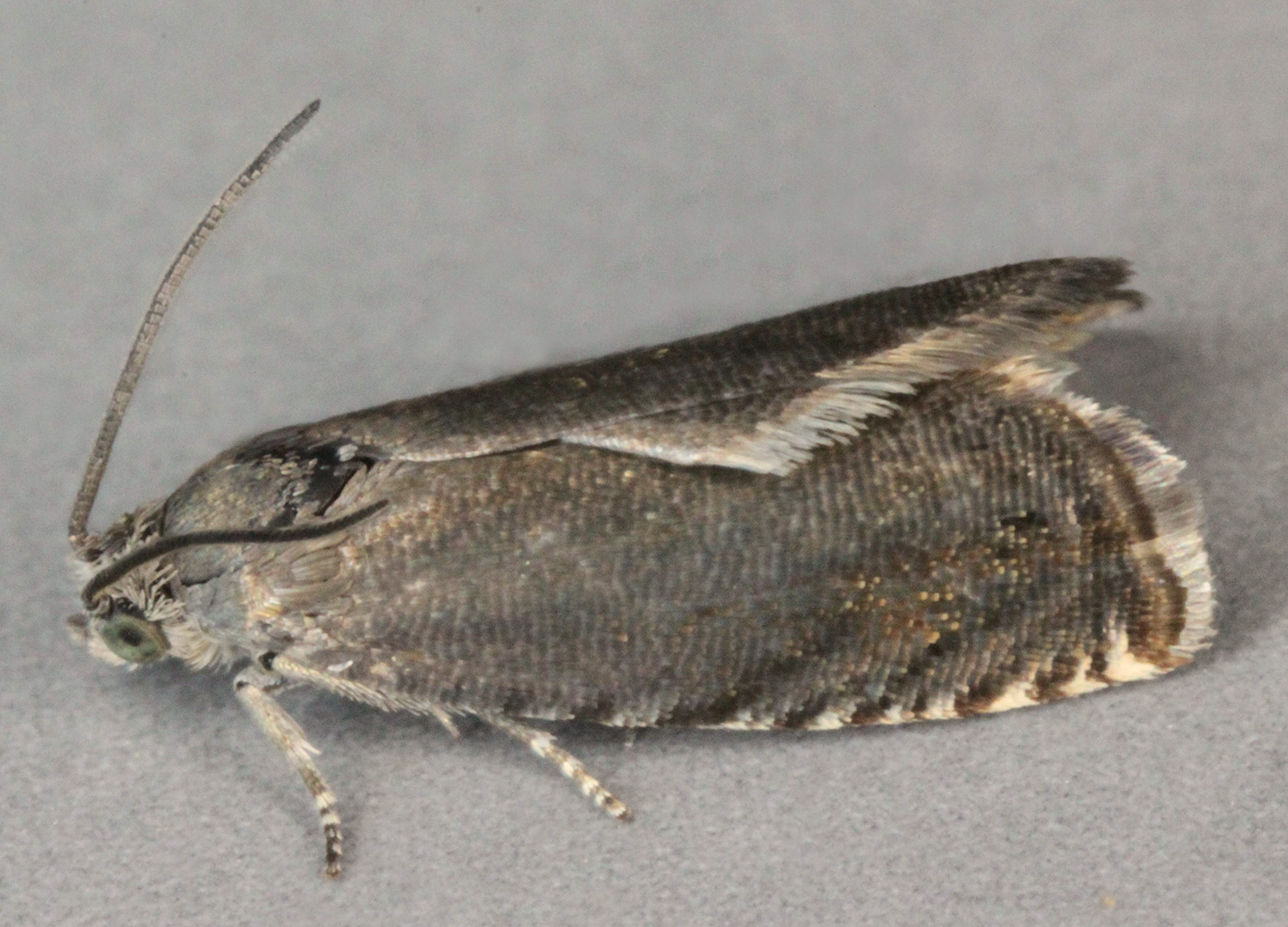
- Cydia nigricana, Deeside, North Wales

Scientific classification
- Kingdom: Animalia
- Phylum: Arthropoda
- Class: Insecta
- Order: Lepidoptera
- Family: Tortricidae
- Genus: Cydia
- Species: C. nigricana

Binomial name
- Cydia nigricana (Fabricius, 1794)

Synonyms
- Pyralis nigricana Fabricius, 1794; Cydia nigricana asiatica Kuznetzov, in Danilevsky & Kuznetsov, 1968; Enarmonia dandana Kearfott, 1907; Laspeyresia novimundi Heinrich, 1920; Endopisa pisana Guenee, 1845; Tortrix proximana Haworth, [1811]; Enarmonia ratifera Meyrick, 1912; Laspeyresia rativera Kuznetzov, in Danilevsky & Kuznetsov, 1968; Phalaena rusticella Clerck, 1759; Endopisa tenebricosana Guenee, 1845; Endopisa viciana Guenee, 1845

= Cydia nigricana =

Pea moth

Pea moth

Cydia nigricana, the pea moth, is a moth of the family Tortricidae. It is found in Europe.

== Description ==
It is a small (15 mm wingspan), grey-brown moth whose larvae (caterpillars) feed in the pods of garden peas. They have a long antennae (compared to the body size), and brownish grey wings with white and yellow spots in herringbone pattern on the edge.

The pupa is dark brown and about 7.8 mm long with rows of spines. Host plants include peas, vetch, clover, and lentils.

They have small yellow white, or creamy white caterpillars, up to 14 mm long, during late June to August. They feed inside pea pods but the damage to the peas can sometimes only be found when the pods are harvested. 1 or 2 of the caterpillars may be found in a single pod and within each pod, only 1 or 2 individual peas may be partially eaten and the attacked pods may develop a yellow appearance and can ripen early.

== Life-cycle ==
The adult moths emerge from cocoons buried in the soil just below the surface, from early June onwards and after feeding on the (pea) plant flowers, the females then lays her 1–3, eggs on the pea plant. On the undersides of the leaves, petioles (stalks of the leaves), stems and also on flowers. The eggs are less than 1 mm (in size) and flat on one side. After about 7–10 days, or 1 to 3 weeks, depending on the temperature, the caterpillars hatch from the eggs and then emerging larvae go through a very short wandering stage (1 day), before burrowing into the pods to feed on the developing peas, for periods of up to a month. The caterpillars grow by a series of moults and then when mature, the caterpillars eat their way out of the pods, usually in August. Larval development lasts 18 to 30 days, and then larvae migrate to the ground to overwinter in the soil, spinning a cocoon containing particles of soil and hibernating inside.

== Pest monitoring and control ==
In the UK, insect netting is used as a preventative, or pheromone traps are used to monitor pea moth problems. It is advised to wait up to 10 to 15 days from the beginning of sustained moth catches until application of insecticide, to allow egg laying and hatching to take place. The RHS recommends not using pesticides as the damage to other beneficial pollinating insects is increased. Other control methods include using quick-maturing cultivars (disrupting the moth life cycle) or growing mange-tout types of pea, in which the pods are eaten before the pea is grown.
