= Prays nephelomima =

Citrus flower moth

Scientific classification
- Kingdom: Animalia
- Phylum: Arthropoda
- Class: Insecta
- Order: Lepidoptera
- Family: Praydidae
- Genus: Prays
- Species: P. nephelomima

Binomial name
- Prays nephelomima Meyrick, 1907

Species of moth

Prays nephelomima, the citrus flower moth, is a moth of the family Praydidae. It is found in Australia (New South Wales and southern Queensland). It was first recorded as being present in New Zealand in 1975.

The wingspan is about 10 mm.
