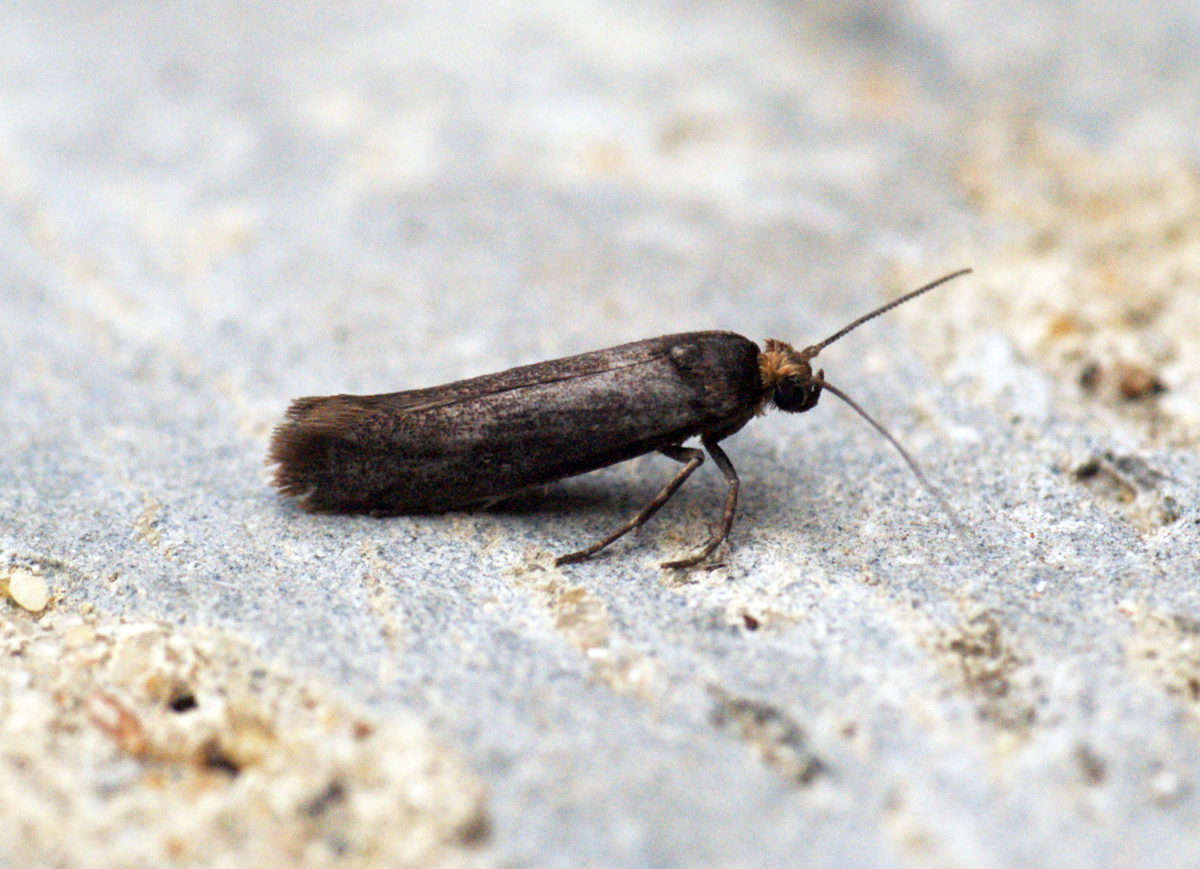
- Prays ruficeps

Scientific classification
- Kingdom: Animalia
- Phylum: Arthropoda
- Class: Insecta
- Order: Lepidoptera
- Family: Praydidae
- Genus: Prays; Hübner, 1825

Species
- See text

Synonyms
- Pepilla Guenée, 1845

= Prays =

Genus of moths

Prays is a genus of moths of the family Praydidae, formerly assigned to (depending on the author) Plutellidae or Yponomeutidae.

== Selected species ==
- Prays acmonias Meyrick, 1914 (from India)
- Prays alpha Moriuti, 1977 (from Japan)
- Prays amblystola Turner, 1923 (from Australia)
- Prays armynoti Bippus, 2020 (from Réunion)
- Prays atomocella (Dyar, 1902) (from Texas)
- Prays autocasis Meyrick, 1907 (from Australia)
- Prays beta Moriuti, 1977 (Japan, Russia, South Korea)
- Prays caenobitella Hübner, 1816
- Prays calycias Meyrick, 1907 (from Queensland)
- Prays chrysophyllae Silvestri, 1915 (from Eritrea)
- Prays cingulata H.L. Yu & H.H. Li, 2004 (from China)
- Prays citri Milliére, 1873 (worldwide distribution)
- Prays curalis Meyrick, 1914 (from India)
- Prays curulis Meyrick, 1914 (from India)
- Prays delta Moriuti, 1977 (from China, South Korea, Japan)
- Prays ducalis Meyrick, (from Sri Lanka)
- Prays endocarpa Meyrick, 1919 (Indonesia/Malaysia)
- Prays endolemma Diakonoff, 1967 (from the Philippines)
- Prays epsilon Moriuti, 1977 (from Japan)
- Prays erebitis Meyrick, (from India, Oriental)
- Prays fraxinella Bjerkander, 1784 (from Europe)
- Prays friesei Klimesch, 1992 (from Canary islands)
- Prays fulvocanella Walsingham, 1907
- Prays galapagosella B. Landry & J.F. Landry, 1998 (Galapagos islands)
- Prays gamma Moriuti, 1977 (from Japan)
- Prays ignota J.F.G.Clarke, 1986 (from Polynesia)
- Prays inconspicua H.L. Yu & H.H. Li, 2004 (from China)
- Prays inscripta Meyrick, 1907 (from Australia)
- Prays iota Moriuti, 1977 (from Japan)
- Prays kappa Moriuti, 1977 (from Japan)
- Prays kalligraphos J.C. Sohn & C.S. Wu, 2011 (from China)
- Prays lambda Moriuti, 1977 (from Japan)
- Prays liophaea Meyrick, 1927
- Prays lobata H.L. Yu & H.H. Li, 2004 (from China)
- Prays nephelomima Meyrick, 1907
- Prays oleae Bernard, 1788 (from Europe)
- Prays oleaceoides Gibeaux, 1985 (from Madagascar)
- Prays oliviella Boyer, 1837
- Prays omicron Moriuti, 1977 (from Japan)
- Prays parilis Turner, 1923 (from Australia)
- Prays peperitis Meyrick, 1907 (from Sri Lanka)
- Prays peregrina Agassiz, 2007 (from England)
- Prays ruficeps Heinemann, 1854 (from Europe)
- Prays sparsipunctella Turati, 1924 (from Libya)
- Prays stratella Zeller, 1877
- Prays sublevatella Viette, 1957 (from Réunion)
- Prays temulenta Meyrick, 1910 (from Himalaya)
- Prays tineiformis J.C. Sohn & C.S. Wu, 2011 (from China)
- Prays tyrastis Meyrick, 1907 (from Australia)
- Prays xeroloxa Meyrick, 1935 (from Java/Indonesia)
