= Paramesia pygmaeana =

Scientific classification
- Domain: Eukaryota
- Kingdom: Animalia
- Phylum: Arthropoda
- Class: Insecta
- Order: Lepidoptera
- Family: Tortricidae
- Genus: Paramesia
- Species: P. pygmaeana

Binomial name
- Paramesia pygmaeana (Amsel, 1956)

Synonyms
- Epagoge pygmaeana Amsel, 1956

Species of moth

Paramesia pygmaeana is a species of moth of the family Tortricidae. It is found in Morocco.
