= Paramesia paracinctana =

Scientific classification
- Domain: Eukaryota
- Kingdom: Animalia
- Phylum: Arthropoda
- Class: Insecta
- Order: Lepidoptera
- Family: Tortricidae
- Genus: Paramesia
- Species: P. paracinctana

Binomial name
- Paramesia paracinctana (Chambon & Khous, 1993)

Synonyms
- Ramapezia paracinctana Chambon & Khous, 1993

Species of moth

Paramesia paracinctana is a species of moth of the family Tortricidae. It is found in Algeria.
