= Eucatagma =

Scientific classification
- Kingdom: Animalia
- Phylum: Arthropoda
- Clade: Pancrustacea
- Class: Insecta
- Order: Lepidoptera
- Family: Praydidae
- Genus: Eucatagma; Busck, 1900

Species
- See text

Genus of moths

Eucatagma is a genus of moths of the family Praydidae.

== Species ==
- Eucatagma amyrisella - Busck, 1900
