= Paramesia alhamana =

Scientific classification
- Domain: Eukaryota
- Kingdom: Animalia
- Phylum: Arthropoda
- Class: Insecta
- Order: Lepidoptera
- Family: Tortricidae
- Genus: Paramesia
- Species: P. alhamana

Binomial name
- Paramesia alhamana (Schmidt, 1933)

Synonyms
- Tortrix (Cnephasia) alhamana Schmidt, 1933

Species of moth

Paramesia alhamana is a species of moth of the family Tortricidae. It is found in Portugal and Spain.

The wingspan is 11–12 mm. Adults have been recorded on wing from June to July.
