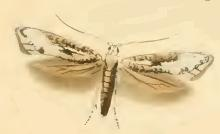

Scientific classification
- Kingdom: Animalia
- Phylum: Arthropoda
- Clade: Pancrustacea
- Class: Insecta
- Order: Lepidoptera
- Family: Praydidae
- Genus: Prays
- Species: P. oleae

Binomial name
- Prays oleae Bernard, 1788

Synonyms
- Prays oleella (Fabricius, 1794); Prays adspersella Herrich-Schäffer, 1855

= Prays oleae =

Olive moth

Species of moth

Prays oleae (olive moth) is a moth of the family Plutellidae found in Europe.

== Description ==
The wingspan is 11–15 millimetres (3/8–5/8 in).

The larvae are a pest on olives (Olea europaea). Other recorded food plants include Phillyrea, jasmine and Ligustrum. They mine the leaves of their host plant which initially consists of an upper-surface, short, narrow corridor.

== Distribution ==
The moth is found in Southern Europe (the Mediterranean region) and North Africa. It was first found in Great Britain at a garden centre in Surrey in 2009 and has since been found at a light trap in Kent.

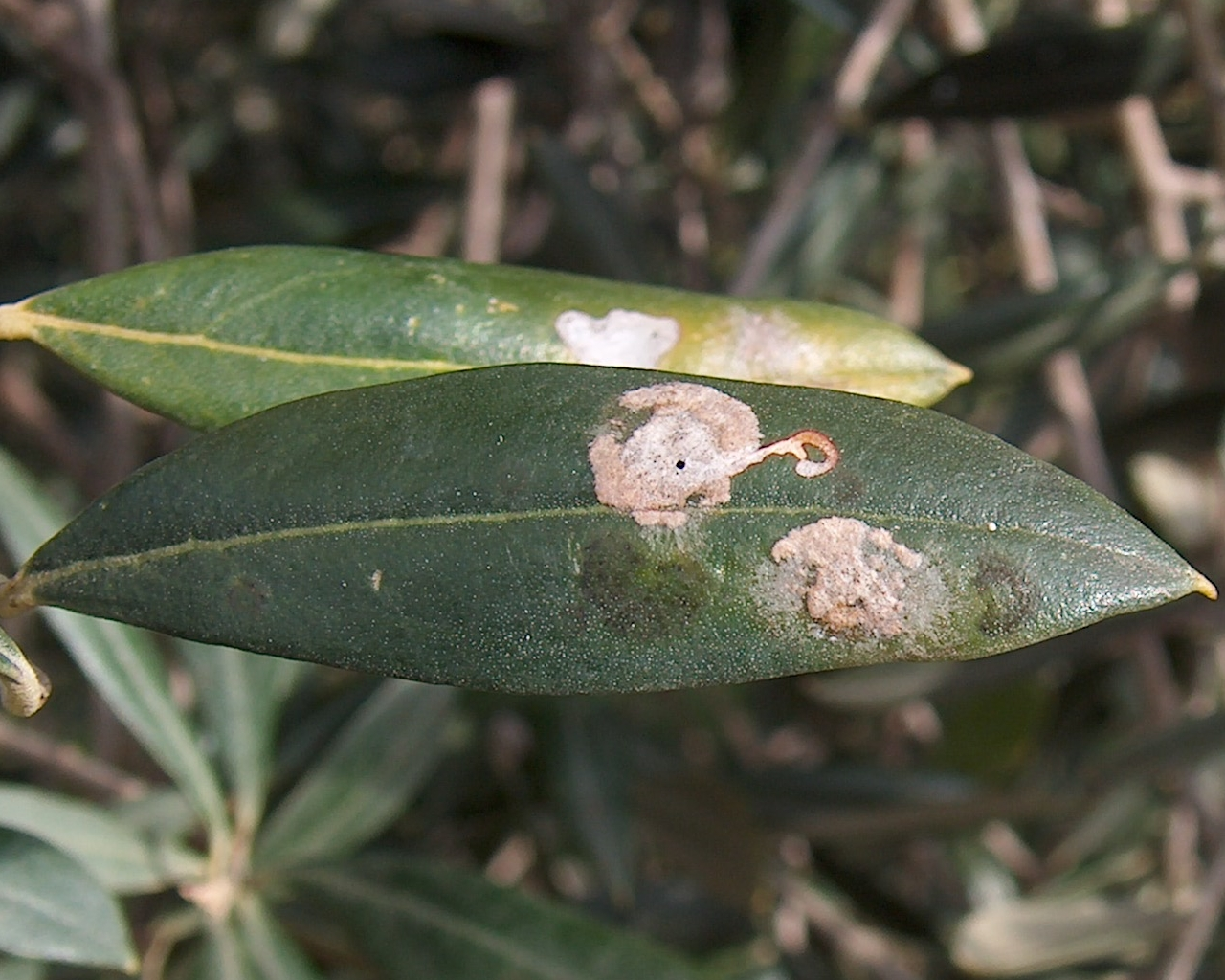
Leafmines created by larvae

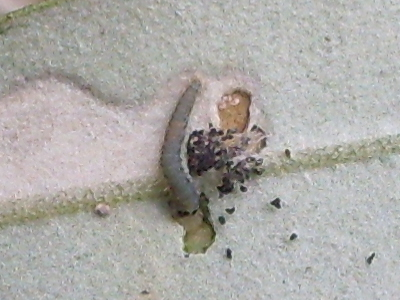
Larva on leaf

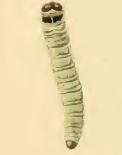
Young larva

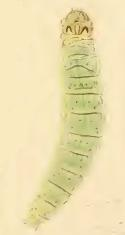
Older larva

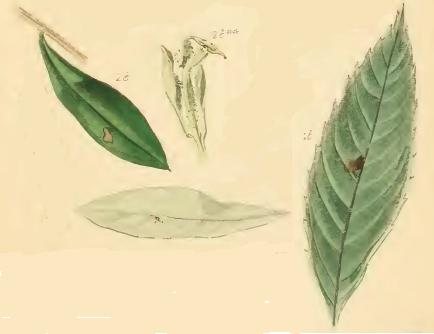
Olive leaves mined by the young larva (2b, 2b*); olive shoot eaten by the mature larva (2b**)
