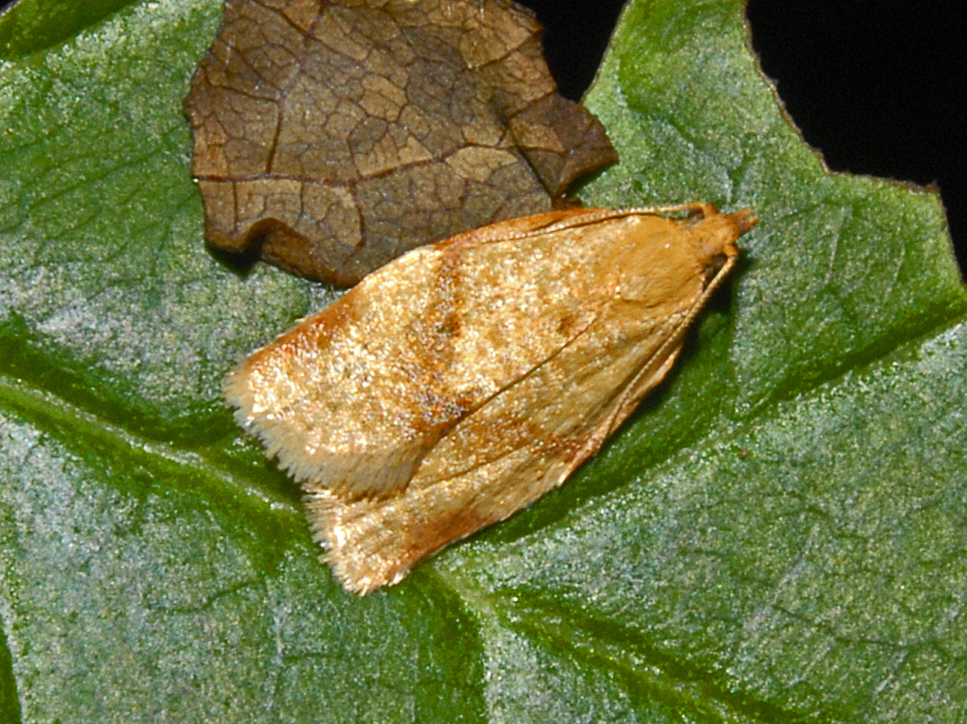
- Paramesia gnomana

Scientific classification
- Domain: Eukaryota
- Kingdom: Animalia
- Phylum: Arthropoda
- Class: Insecta
- Order: Lepidoptera
- Family: Tortricidae
- Tribe: Archipini
- Genus: Paramesia; Stephens, 1829

Synonyms
- Ramapesia Razowski, 1981; Ramapezia Chambon & Khous, 1993

= Paramesia =

Genus of tortrix moths

Paramesia is a genus of moths belonging to the family Tortricidae.

== Species ==
- Paramesia alhamana (Schmidt, 1933)
- Paramesia gnomana (Clerck, 1759)
- Paramesia paracinctana (Chambon & Khous, 1993)
- Paramesia pygmaeana (Amsel, 1956)

== See also ==
- List of Tortricidae genera
