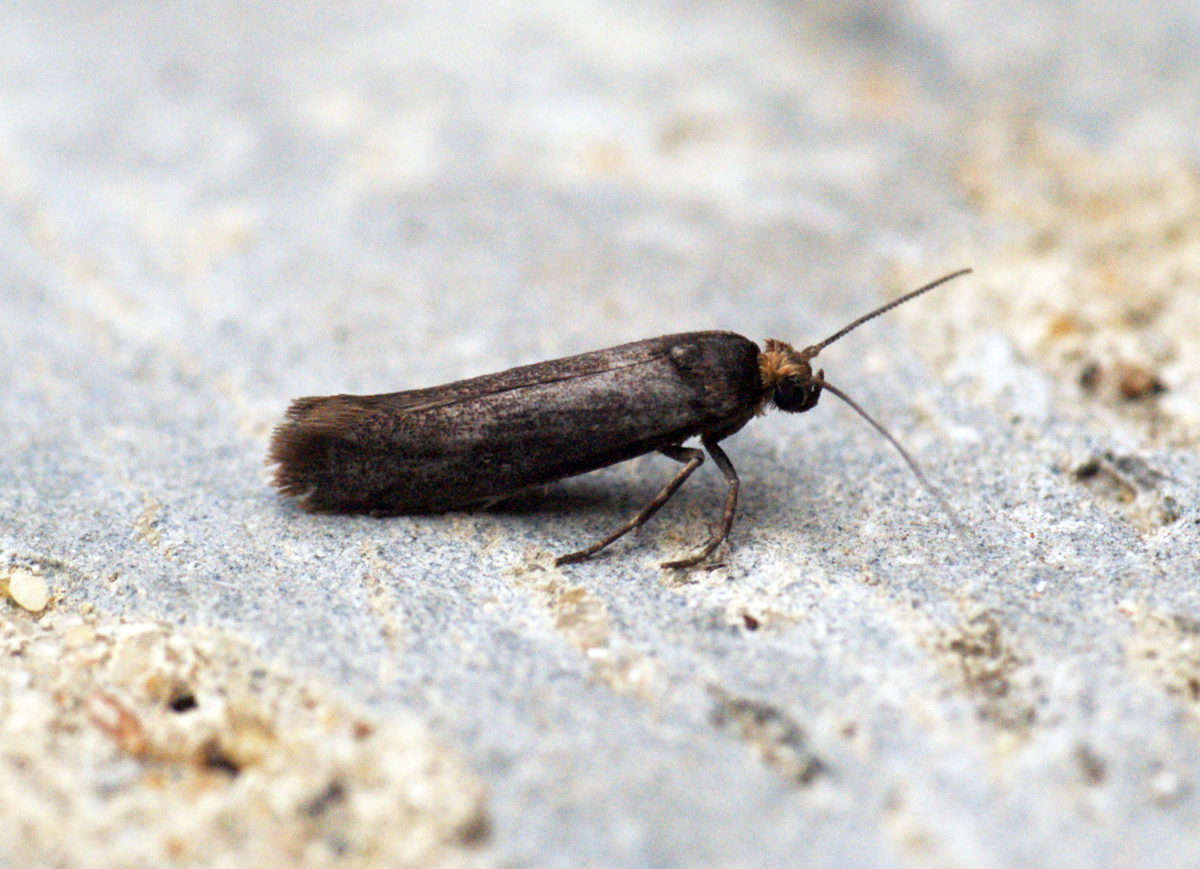

Scientific classification
- Kingdom: Animalia
- Phylum: Arthropoda
- Clade: Pancrustacea
- Class: Insecta
- Order: Lepidoptera
- Family: Praydidae
- Genus: Prays
- Species: P. ruficeps

Binomial name
- Prays ruficeps Heinemann, 1854

Synonyms
- Oecophora ruficeps; Prays rustica; Prays simplicella

= Prays ruficeps =

Species of moth

Prays ruficeps is a moth of the family Plutellidae. It is found in Northern and Central Europe.

The wingspan is 14–17 mm.

The larvae feed on ash trees (Fraxinus excelsior).
