= Pauline Newsome =

German-born British Circus equestrian performer

Pauline Newsome, née Hinné (1825–1904), was a German-born British Circus equestrian performer.

She was the daughter of the German equestrian Hinné. She was an internationally famous equestrian performer. In 1844, she left Germany for Great Britain, where she was engaged in the Astley Cirkus. In 1846, married the equestrian performer and circus proprietor James Newsome (1824–1912). James and Pauline Newsome often performed together as equestrians. She and her spouse managed their own circus, and for a period four circus companies in Great Britain, having a major importance in the contemporary circus world, until 1889. She was one of the main attractions of her theatre.
