= Hugh C. Newsome =

American politician in Arkansas

Hugh C. Newsome was an American teacher, postal clerk, city marshall, and state legislator in Arkansas. In 1887, he served in the Arkansas House of Representatives.

Newsome served as a county judge from 1882 until 1884. He married.

== See also ==
- African American officeholders from the end of the Civil War until before 1900
