= Distagmos =

Scientific classification
- Kingdom: Animalia
- Phylum: Arthropoda
- Class: Insecta
- Order: Lepidoptera
- Family: Lasiocampidae
- Genus: Distagmos; Herrich-Schäffer, 1853

Species
- See text

Genus of moths

Distagmos is a genus of moths of the family Plutellidae.

== Species ==
- Distagmos ledereri - Herrich-Schäffer 1854
