= David Newsome =

American scientist

- Born: 16 April 1942
- Died: February 24, 2011 (aged 68)
- Education: Duke University (B.A.); Columbia University College of Physicians and Surgeons(M.D.)
- Occupation: Ophthalmology

David Anthony Newsome M.D. FARVO (16 April 1942 – 24 February 2011) was an American scientist, ophthalmologist, inventor, and author. He studied the treatment of age-related macular degeneration and proposed the usefulness of zinc supplements to slow the rate of vision loss from age-related macular degeneration.

He also found that the eye's pigmented retina, a type of covering or epithelial tissue, could produce some types of collagen. His findings came when it was thought that epithelial tissues either could not (or did not) produce collagen. His new observations opened a new field of investigation of the collagen and related structural molecules in the eye and other tissues.

== Biography ==
A native of North Carolina, Newsome earned a B.A. from Duke University and an M.D. from the Columbia University College of Physicians and Surgeons. He completed a residency in ophthalmology at Massachusetts Eye and Ear Hospital. He then served as a medical and surgical Fellow in retinal diseases, followed by a fellowship in retinal and surgical diseases at the Bascom Palmer Eye Institute, University of Miami.

He continued clinical research and training activities at the National Eye Institute, National Institutes of Health, where he rose to Chief of the Retinal and Ocular Connective Tissue Disease Section, National Eye Institute. He subsequently became Associate Professor of Ophthalmology in the Wilmer Eye Institute at Johns Hopkins University. He next accepted a tenured Professorship of Ophthalmology at Louisiana State University. During that time, he continued to head a research laboratory and pursue teaching activities as Clinical Professor of Ophthalmology, Tulane University School of Medicine.

He then established a private clinical practice in New Orleans, Louisiana. After 15 years as President of the Retinal Institute of Louisiana, which he founded and operated, he was forced by the aftermath of Hurricane Katrina to relocate to the Tampa Bay area of Florida. He left clinical medicine to accept the position of Chief Scientific Officer of an emerging pharmaceutical industry.

== Philanthropy ==
Throughout his professional career, Newsome was active in philanthropic endeavors. Locally, he founded the Meals on Wheels New Orleans Fund. He founded Eye Care Haiti. Headquartered in Port-au-Prince, the organization added multiple rural clinics in addition to the operating suites and training programs in the capital city.

== Awards ==
In January 2009, he received the Founding Patron Award from Meals on Wheels New Orleans. The award was presented at the first fundraising gala since Katrina, and marked the rebirth of one of the most important people-to-people services in the community.

In May 2010, he became a Fellow of the Association for Research in Vision and Ophthalmology, the world's leading eye and vision research group.

== Publications ==
He authored approximately 160 peer-reviewed professional papers and one professional book, Retinal Dystrophies and Degenerations, Raven Press, New York, 1988.

He also co-wrote a cookbook, The New Orleans Program: Eat, Exercise, Enjoy Life, a collaboration with award-winning New Orleans Chef John Besh, which combines recipes and nutrition with common-sense advice on weight to prevent diabetes and other diseases.

== Selected References ==
1. Smith GN, Linsemmayer TF, Newsome DA, Synthesis of type II collagen in vitro by embryonic chick neural retina tissue. Proc Natl Acad Sci USA, 73:4420-4423,1976
2. Newsome DA, Swartz M, Leone NC, Elston RC, Miller ED. Oral zinc in macular degenerations. Arch Ophthalmol 106:192-198, 1988
3. Tate Jr., DJ, Newsome DA. A novel zinc compound (Zinc-monocysteine) enhances the antioxidant capacity of human retinal pigment epithelial cells. Curr Eye Research 2006; 31:675-683
4. Newsome DA. A randomized prospective, placebo controlled clinical trial of a novel zinc-monocysteine material in age-related macular degeneration. Curr Eye Res 2008;33:591-598
5. A Randomized, Placebo-Controlled, Clinical Trial of High-Dose Supplementation With Vitamins C and E, Beta Carotene, and Zinc for Age-Related Macular Degeneration and Vision Loss: AREDS Report No. 8. Arch Ophthalmol 2001;119:1417-1436
