= Newson =

Newson is an English surname and given name. Notable people with the name include:

== People ==
=== Surname ===
- Bob Newson (1910–1988), South African cricketer
- George Newson (born 1932), English avant garde composer
- Henry Winston Newson (1909–1978), American physicist
- Jared Newson (born 1984), American basketball player
- Linda Newson, academic
- Lloyd Newson (born 1957), director, dancer and choreographer
- Kendall Newson (born 1980), American football player
- Marc Newson (born 1963), Australian industrial designer
- Mark Newson (born 1960), English footballer
- Mary Frances Winston Newson (1869–1959), American mathematician
- Moses Newson (born 1927), American journalist
- Percy Newson (1874–1950), English banker
- Thomas Newson (born 1994), Dutch DJ and record producer
- Tony Newson (born 1979), American former professional football linebacker
- Warren Newson (born 1964), American baseball player
- Zoe Newson (born 1992), British powerlifter

=== Given name ===
- Newson Garrett (1812–1893), English brewer

== Fictional characters ==
- Richard Newson, a character in Hardy's novel The Mayor of Casterbridge

== See also ==
- Newsom, another name
