= Leo Dale Newsom =

American entomologist

Leo Dale Newsom (23 February 1915 – 10 October 1987) was an American entomologist and specialist on crop pest management particularly in cotton and soybean cultivation and was known for his approaches to Integrated Pest Management.

Newsom's was born in Shongaloo, where his father was a cotton farmer and his mother was a teacher. He went to the local high school and grew up with an interest in dogs and hunting. In 1936 he went to study at the Louisiana Technological University where he became interested in entomology. He moved to Louisiana State University and obtained a BS in 1940 while also becoming a college boxing champion. He then went to Cornell University but the war interrupted his studies, and he joined the US Army Medical Corps in 1942 working on mosquito and louse control. He returned to Cornell in 1946 and received his PhD with studies on "The Biology and Economic Importance of the Clover Root Borer, Hylastinus obscurus (Marsham)" in 1947. His contemporaries included Floyd Miner, Willard Whitcomb, and Robert L. Metcalf. He then moved to Louisiana State University and worked on the entomology of cotton and other pests for the rest of his life.

Newsom's research findings included the life history of the boll weevil and its diapause which required the accumulation of fat for overwintering. He identified a combination of management practices that included the careful and limited use of pesticides like DDT to manage weevil populations. The method is known as the Newsom/Brazzel system. He was a promoter of careful monitoring of pests for intelligent management and opposed to the use of fixed and mindless pesticide spraying schedules.

He died at Magazine, Arkansas. He was married to Alma née Green (1920-2018).
