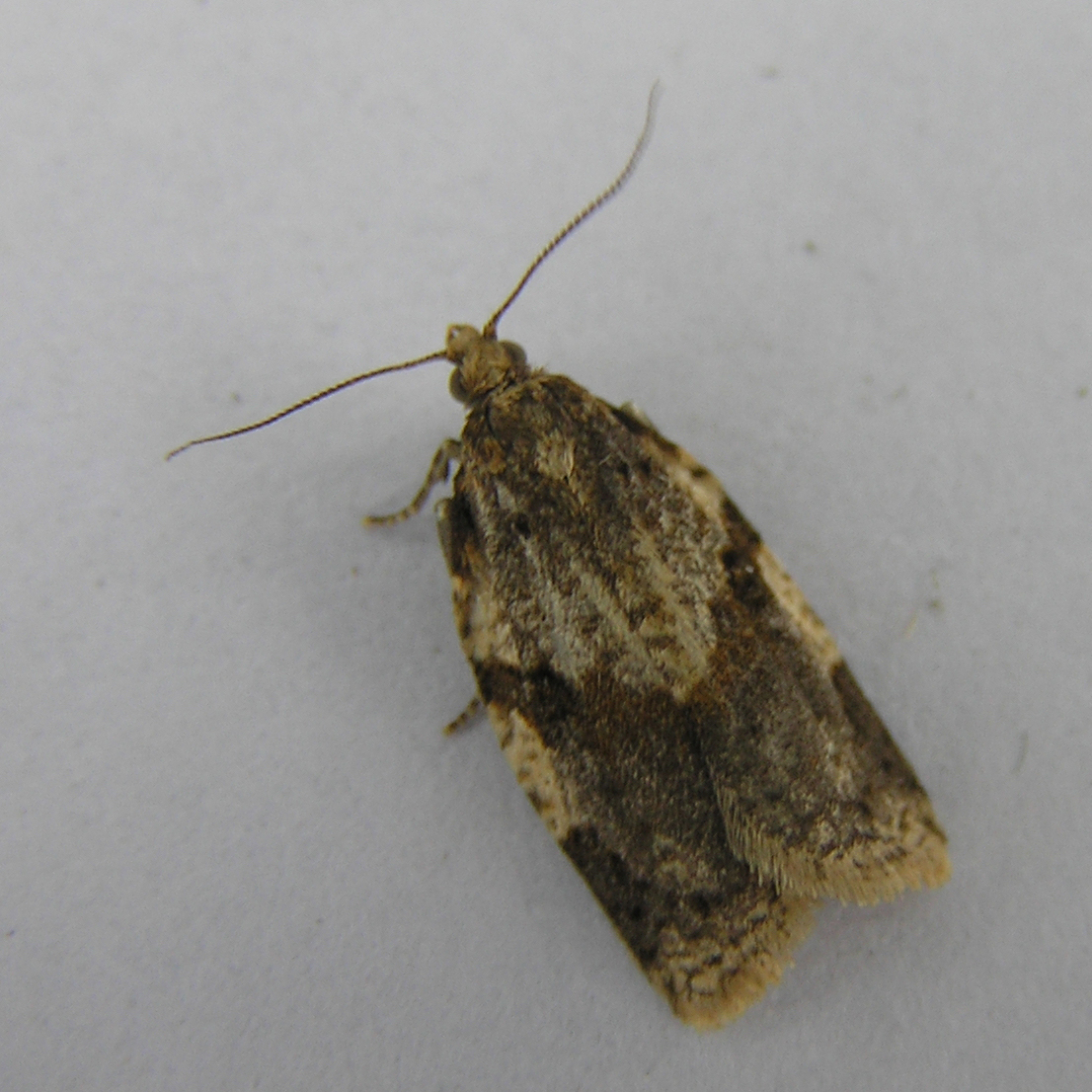

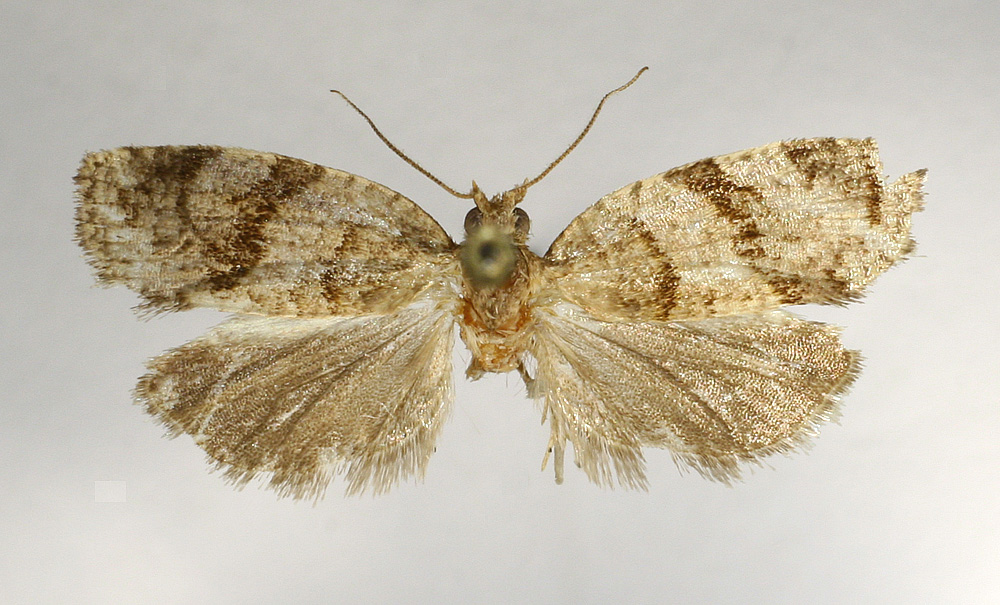

Scientific classification
- Kingdom: Animalia
- Phylum: Arthropoda
- Clade: Pancrustacea
- Class: Insecta
- Order: Lepidoptera
- Family: Tortricidae
- Genus: Clepsis
- Species: C. spectrana

Binomial name
- Clepsis spectrana (Treitschke, 1830)

Synonyms
- Tortrix spectrana Treitschke, 1830; Cacoecia costana ab. fuliginosana Schille, 1917; Tortrix costana var. intermedia Mansbridge, 1914; Cacoecia costana ab. larseni Strand, 1927; Tortrix latiorana Stainton, 1857; Tortrix costana var. liverana Mansbridge, 1914; Tortrix vinculana Treitschke, 1830

= Clepsis spectrana =

Species of moth

Clepsis spectrana, the cyclamen tortrix, cabbage leafroller or straw-colored tortrix, is a moth of the family Tortricidae. It is found in Europe.

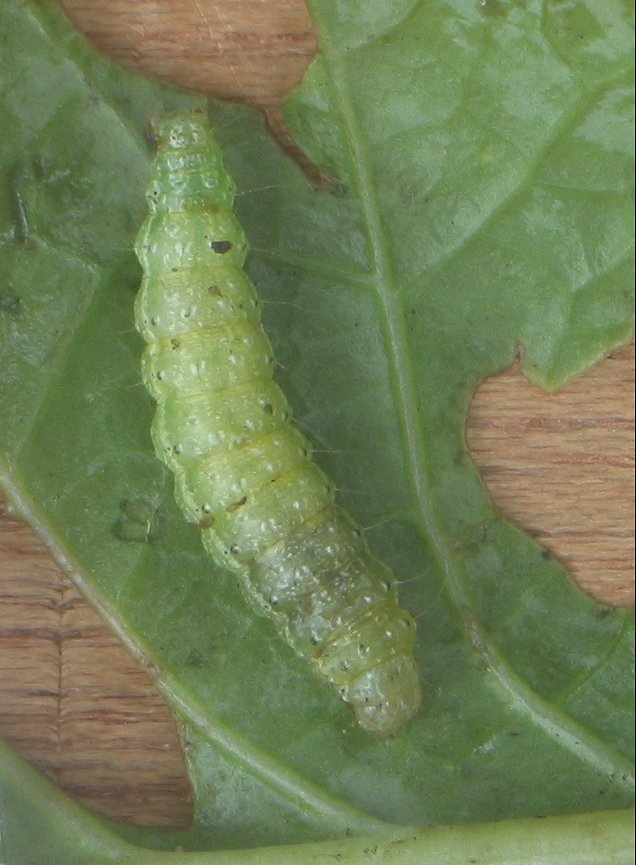
Caterpillar

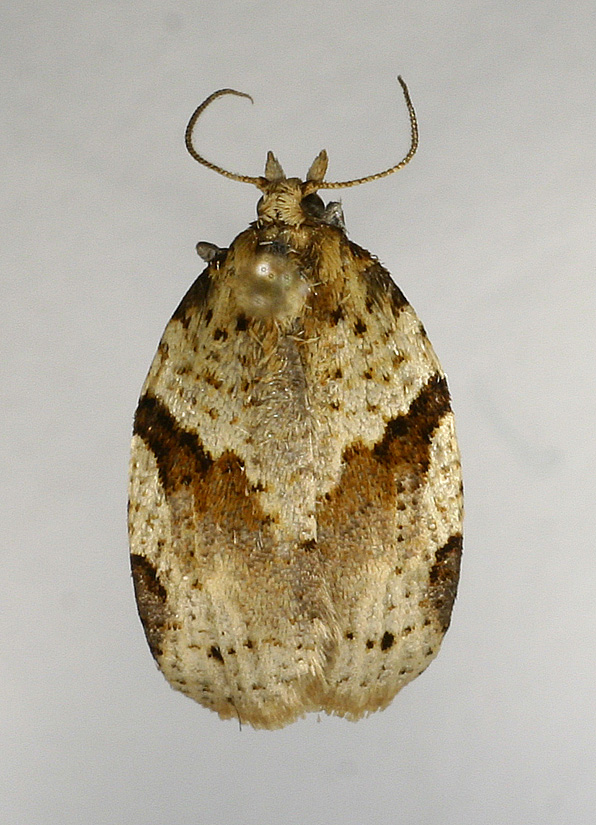

The wingspan is 16–22 mm. The color is very variable, but the ground color of the forewing is often more or less brown. The wing usually has two dark spots at the costa; edge, the innermost is square and the outermost oval. Behind the outermost spot there is usually a small, round black spot. Paler individuals have clear, fine, brown crosslines. The hindwings are brownish-white.

The moth flies in two generations from late April to September.

The larvae feed on various trees, shrubs and cabbage.
