= John R. Newsome =

- Notable work: Colorado's 4th Judicial District Attorney, President of the Colorado District Attorneys' Council (since early 2008)

John Newsome was the U.S. state of Colorado's 4th Judicial District Attorney. He was first elected in 2004, defeating Dan May 57-43. May challenged Newsome for the Republican nomination in 2008.

== Achievements ==
Newsome created the Special Victims Unit, which focuses on prosecuting violent crimes against especially vulnerable victims. He has also partnered with other law enforcement agencies to form LIMIT (Local Interagency Methamphetamine And Identity Theft Task Force) to combat methamphetamine and identity theft. His office also prosecutes a record number of felony cases, approximately 150% more than his predecessors did.

== Awards ==
Since taking office, Newsome has received numerous distinctions and awards, serving as President of the Colorado District Attorneys' Council since early 2008. On September 11, 2007, Colorado Governor Bill Ritter tapped Newsome to serve as part of a small group dedicated to studying the best ways to collect, preserve, and analyze DNA evidence.

== 2004 election ==
In 2004, Dan May, the Assistant District Attorney to DA Jeanne Smith, ran against John Newsome in a highly contentious campaign. Newsome prevailed in the election and became the next District Attorney.

== 2008 election ==
Newsome was expected to run unopposed for re-election in the 2008 election, but after news reports alleged that he had been seen consuming alcoholic beverages in bars then driving off in his county-owned vehicle, Dan May announced he would run, and collected enough signatures to get on the Republican primary ballot. KOAA TV, which filmed Newsome drinking at a local bar before driving, has yet to release the full tape.

On August 12, 2008, Republican voters in the 4th Judicial District replaced Newsome with Dan May by a margin of more than 20 points.
