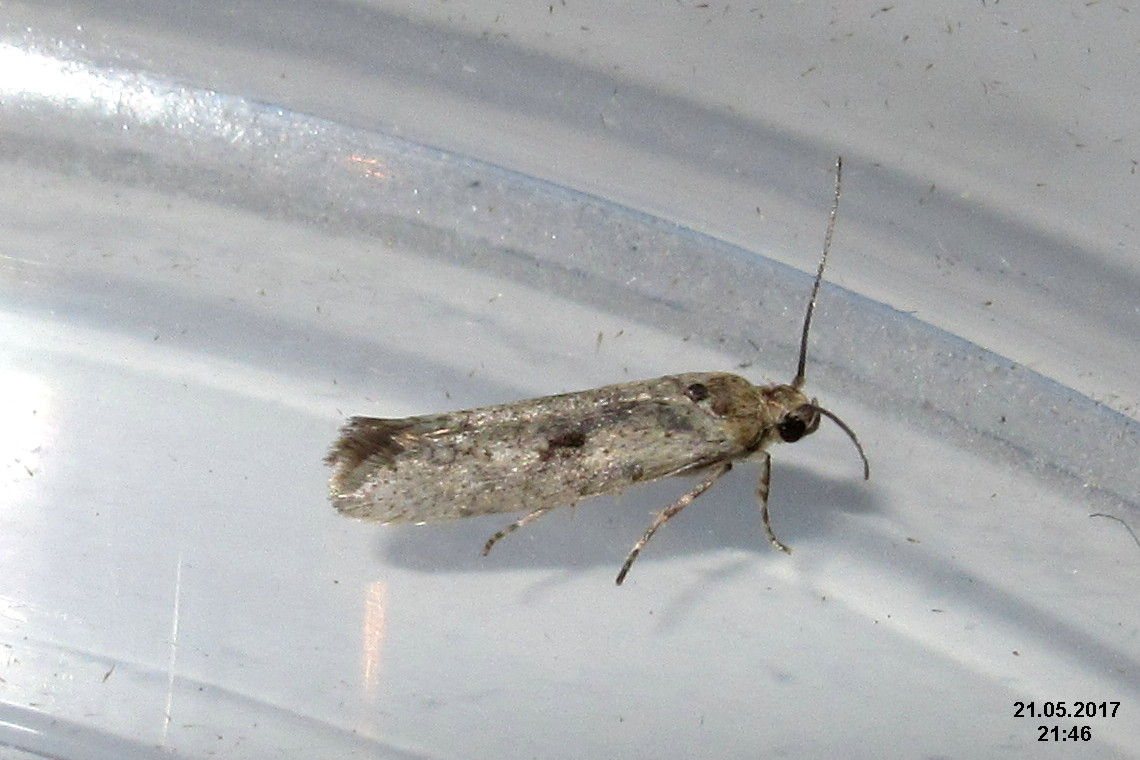
- Prays oleae

Scientific classification
- Kingdom: Animalia
- Phylum: Arthropoda
- Class: Insecta
- Order: Lepidoptera
- Superfamily: Yponomeutoidea
- Family: Praydidae

= Praydidae =

Family of moths

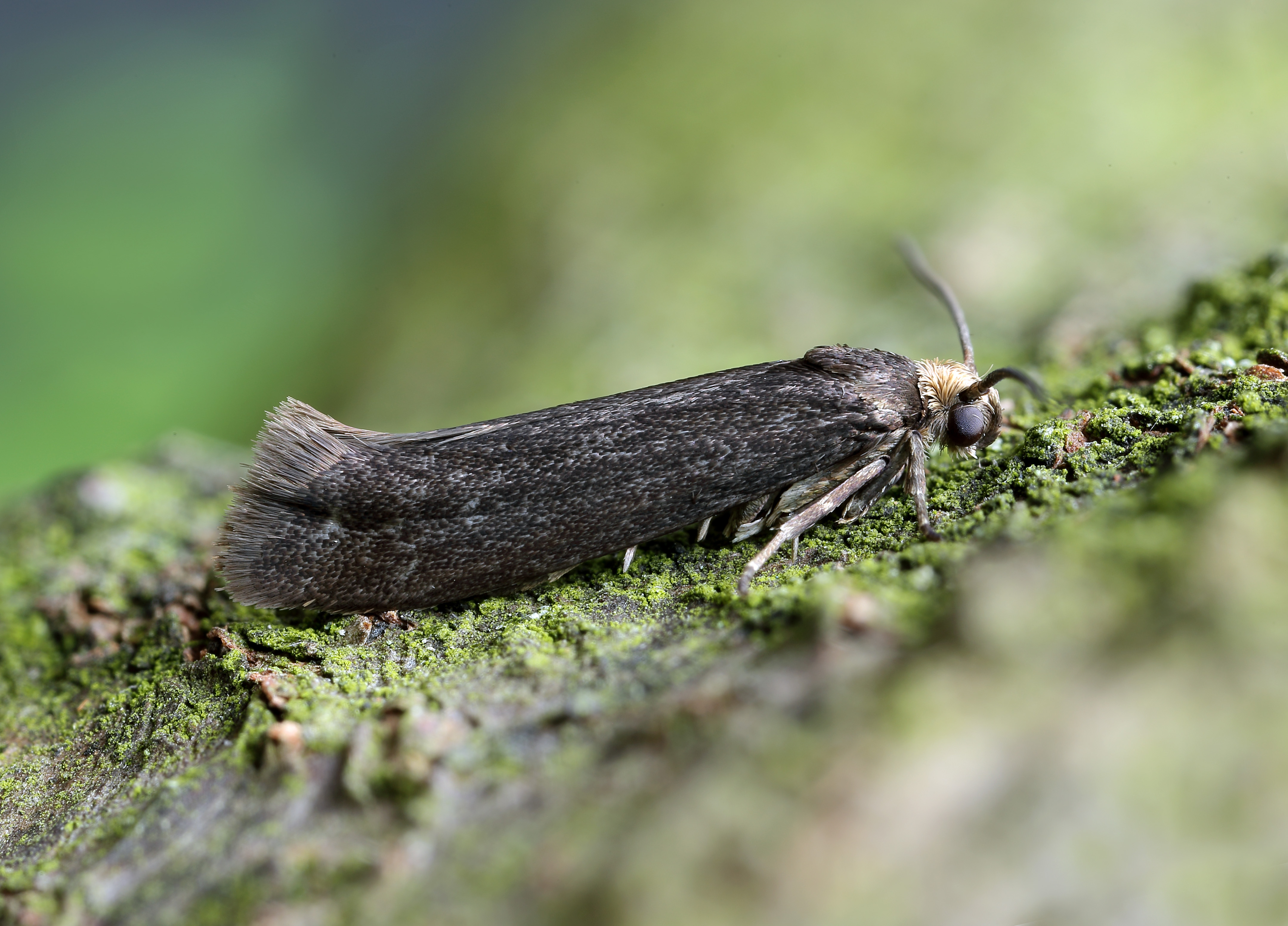
Prays ruficeps

Praydidae is a family of false ermine moths in the superfamily Yponomeutoidea. Though once considered a subfamily (Praydinae), a 2013 molecular analysis elevated it to family rank.

== Genera ==
- Atemelia Herrich-Schäffer, 1853
- Dictyoprays J.C. Sohn, 2012
- Distagmos Herrich-Schäffer, 1853
- Eucatagma Busck, 1900
- Prays Hübner, [1825]
