= Podocarpus oblongus =

Scientific classification
- Kingdom: Plantae
- Clade: Tracheophytes
- Clade: Gymnosperms
- Division: Pinophyta
- Class: Pinopsida
- Order: Araucariales
- Family: Podocarpaceae
- Genus: Podocarpus
- Species: P. oblongus

Binomial name
- Podocarpus oblongus de Laub. (2015)

Synonyms
- Podocarpus rumphii subsp. aruensis (Silba) Silba (2010); Podocarpus rumphii var. aruensis Silba (2000)

Species of conifer

Podocarpus oblongus is a species of conifer in the family Podocarpaceae. It is a tree endemic to western New Guinea, where it inhabits the southern Vogelkop Peninsula and the Aru Islands.

It is a large tree growing up to 27 meters tall. It is distinguished by globular foliage buds, linear-oblong leaves 10–17 cm long by 1.4–2.7 cm wide, broadly acute to slightly acuminate apices, and pollen cones in groups of two or three or less often solitary. It resembles Podocarpus rumphii, but differs in having shorter leaves (10–17 cm, vs. 16–24 cm for P. rumphii), pollen cones in groups of three or fewer, and overlapping rather than imbricate scales on foliage buds.
