= Podocarpus confertus =

Conservation status
- Endangered (IUCN 3.1)

Scientific classification
- Kingdom: Plantae
- Clade: Tracheophytes
- Clade: Gymnospermae
- Division: Pinophyta
- Class: Pinopsida
- Order: Araucariales
- Family: Podocarpaceae
- Genus: Podocarpus
- Species: P. confertus

Binomial name
- Podocarpus confertus de Laub.

Synonyms
- Podocarpus neriifolius subsp. penibukanensis (Silba) Silba; Podocarpus neriifolius var. penibukanensis Silba

Species of conifer

Podocarpus confertus is a species of conifer in the family Podocarpaceae. It is endemic to Borneo.

Podocarpus confertus grows in kerangas forest on poor, sandy soils and in stunted forest on ultrabasic rocks, from 100 and 1,200 meters elevation. It can form dense stands, or grow in mixed forests with other coniferous and broadleaf trees and shrubs.
