= Podocarpus novoguineensis =

Scientific classification
- Kingdom: Plantae
- Clade: Tracheophytes
- Clade: Gymnosperms
- Division: Pinophyta
- Class: Pinopsida
- Order: Araucariales
- Family: Podocarpaceae
- Genus: Podocarpus
- Species: P. novoguineensis

Binomial name
- Podocarpus novoguineensis de Laub. (2015)

Species of conifer

Podocarpus novoguineensis is a species of conifer in the family Podocarpaceae. It is endemic to New Guinea.

Podocarpus novoguineensis is a medium-sized tree which grows to 25 metres tall. It is part of the P. neriifolius group in the section Longifoliolatus. The species is distinguished in having the largest leaves in section Longifoliolatus. The leaves are long, pendulous, and linear, 13 to 16 cm long by 1.4 to 1.8 cm wide, tapering gradually at both ends, with weak upper midribs and long spreading outer bud scales to 10 mm long.

The species is uncommon, growing in hill and montane forests across the island of New Guinea from 510 to at least 1,800 metres elevation.

David de Laubenfels described it as a distinct species in 2015. Specimens were formerly identified as P. neriifolius.
