= Podocarpus costaricensis =

Conservation status
- Critically Endangered (IUCN 3.1)

Scientific classification
- Kingdom: Plantae
- Clade: Tracheophytes
- Clade: Gymnosperms
- Division: Pinophyta
- Class: Pinopsida
- Order: Araucariales
- Family: Podocarpaceae
- Genus: Podocarpus
- Species: P. costaricensis

Binomial name
- Podocarpus costaricensis de Laub.

Species of conifer

Podocarpus costaricensis is a species of conifer in the family Podocarpaceae. It is endemic to Costa Rica, where it is known from four locations in San José Province. It grows in lowland and lower montane tropical rainforest from 70 to 1,700 meters elevation. The species was described in 1990, and its distribution and ecology are poorly understood.
