= Podocarpus humbertii =

Conservation status
- Endangered (IUCN 3.1)

Scientific classification
- Kingdom: Plantae
- Clade: Tracheophytes
- Clade: Gymnospermae
- Division: Pinophyta
- Class: Pinopsida
- Order: Araucariales
- Family: Podocarpaceae
- Genus: Podocarpus
- Species: P. humbertii

Binomial name
- Podocarpus humbertii de Laub.

Species of conifer

Podocarpus humbertii is a species of conifer in the family Podocarpaceae. It is endemic to Madagascar.

The plant is known from five to seven locations in forested and wooded habitat.
