= Podocarpus globulus =

Conservation status
- Endangered (IUCN 3.1)

Scientific classification
- Kingdom: Plantae
- Clade: Tracheophytes
- Clade: Gymnosperms
- Division: Pinophyta
- Class: Pinopsida
- Order: Araucariales
- Family: Podocarpaceae
- Genus: Podocarpus
- Species: P. globulus

Binomial name
- Podocarpus globulus de Laub.

Species of conifer

Podocarpus globulus is a species of conifer in the family Podocarpaceae. It is endemic to Borneo, where there are only four known subpopulations, found in Sabah and on the Sabahan border with Sarawak, although it may have undiscovered populations elsewhere in these states or in neighbouring Kalimantan.

Podocarpus globulus grows in lower to middle montane rain forests, and on ridges and summits in lowland and hill forests where the forest is not dominated by dipterocarps, between 310 and 1,530 meters elevation. It also grows in some areas with ultrabasic soil.
