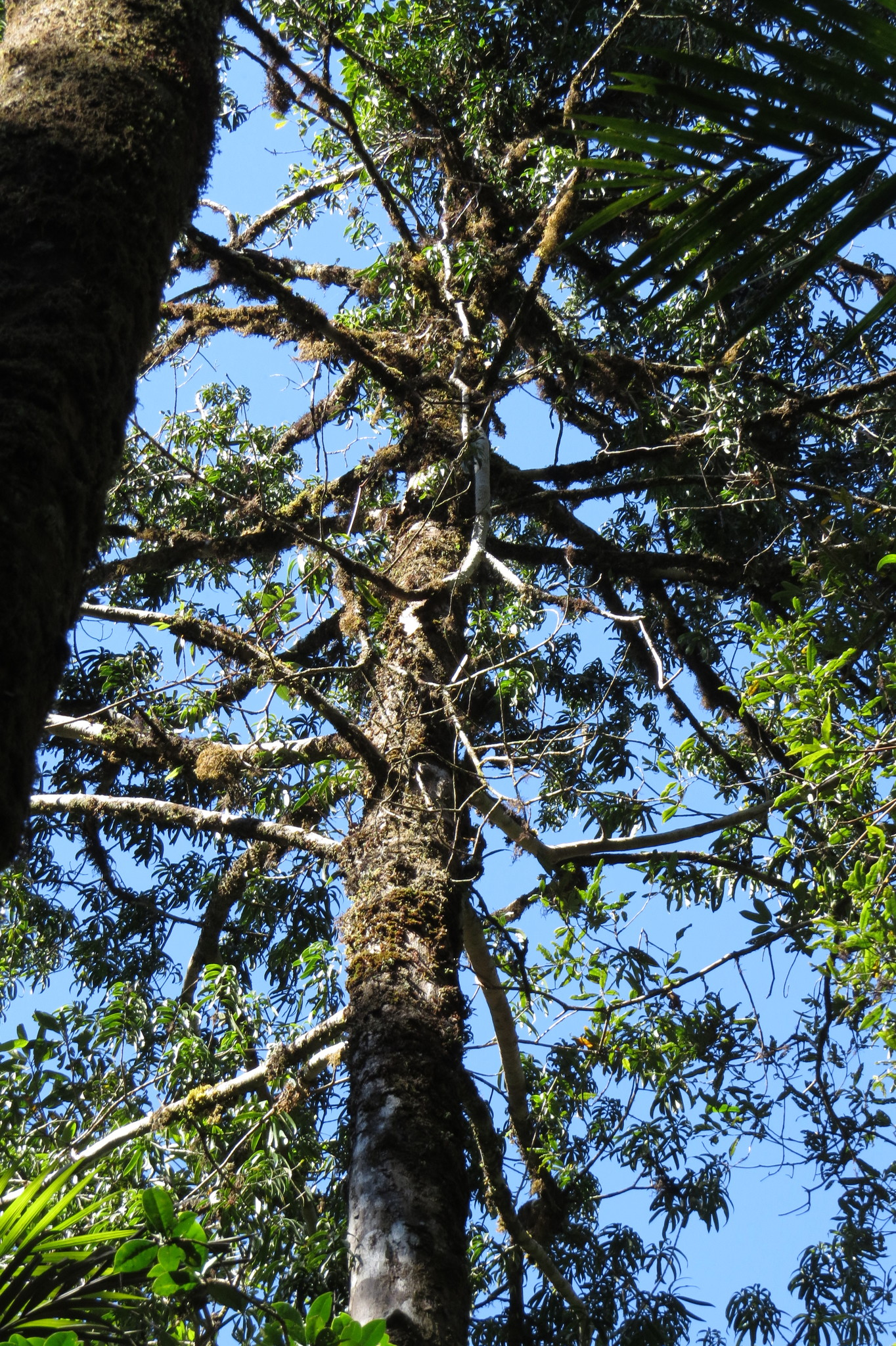

Conservation status
- Least Concern (IUCN 3.1)

Scientific classification
- Kingdom: Plantae
- Clade: Tracheophytes
- Clade: Gymnosperms
- Division: Pinophyta
- Class: Pinopsida
- Order: Araucariales
- Family: Podocarpaceae
- Genus: Podocarpus
- Species: P. smithii

Binomial name
- Podocarpus smithii de Laub.

= Podocarpus smithii =

Species of conifer

Podocarpus smithii is a species of conifer in the family Podocarpaceae. It is a tree endemic to Queensland, Australia.
