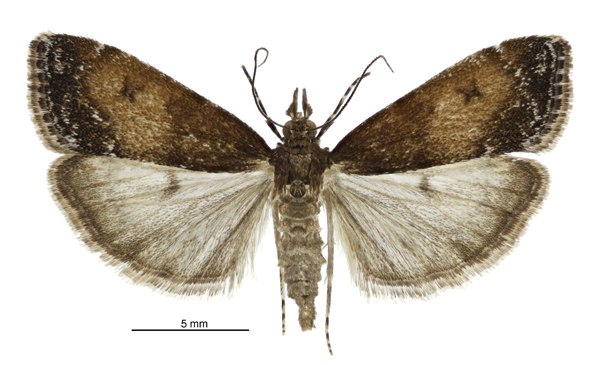
- Female

Scientific classification
- Kingdom: Animalia
- Phylum: Arthropoda
- Class: Insecta
- Order: Lepidoptera
- Family: Crambidae
- Genus: Eudonia
- Species: E. asterisca

Binomial name
- Eudonia asterisca (Meyrick, 1884)

Synonyms
- Xeroscopa asterisca Meyrick, 1884; Scoparia asterisca (Meyrick, 1884)

= Eudonia asterisca =

Species of moth endemic to New Zealand

Eudonia asterisca is a moth in the family Crambidae. It was named by Edward Meyrick in 1884 and is endemic to New Zealand. It has been recorded in both the North and South Islands. This species is recorded as being present at sea level up to altitudes of 1350 m. This species has been recorded as inhabiting native podocarp/hardwood forests. The adults of this species are on the wing from December until March although they have also been recorded in October and November. They are attracted to light and have also been trapped via sugar traps.

== Taxonomy ==
This species was first described by Edward Myrick in 1884 using specimens collected at Arthur's Pass, Mount Hutt, Lake Wakatipu in January and named Xeroscopa asterisca. Meyrick added further described the species in 1885. In 1913 Meyrick placed the species within the genus Scoparia. George Hudson described and illustrated this species in the book The butterflies and moths of New Zealand. In 1988 John S. Dugdale placed this species in the genus Eudonia. The male lectotype, collected at Lake Wakatipu by R. W. Fereday, is held at the Natural History Museum, London.

== Description ==
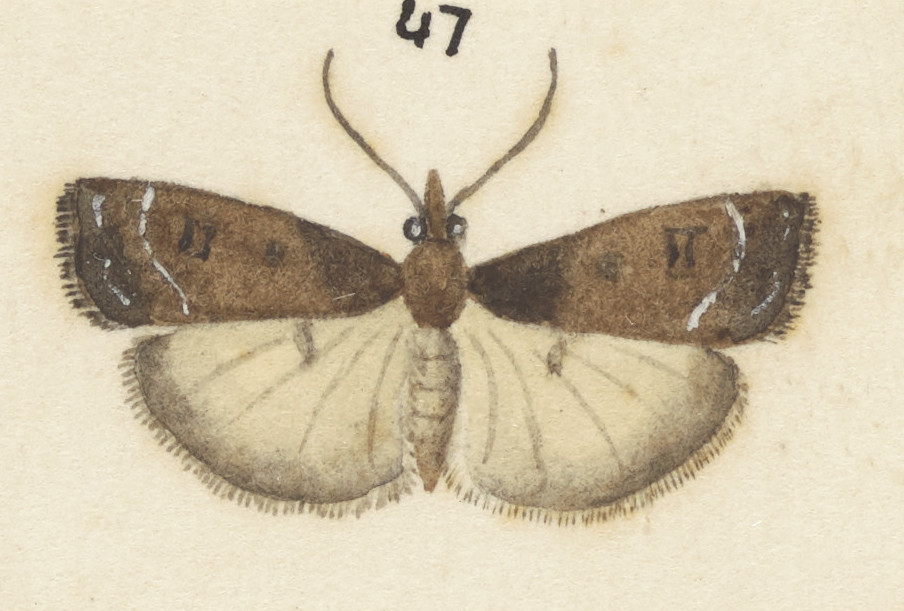
Illustration of female by Hudson.

Meyrick described this species as follows:

Male, female. — 21-23 mm. Head and thorax fuscous, suffused with dark fuscous. Palpi 2 1/4, dark fuscous, basal joint white. Antennae fuscous; ciliations 1/2. Abdomen whitish-grey. Legs whitish irrorated with dark fuscous, tibiae and tarsi banded with black. Forewings rather elongate, triangular, costa hardly arched, apex rounded, hindmargin almost straight, rather oblique; dull ochreous-fuscous, basal and terminal areas suffused with dark greyish-fuscous; first line, orbicular, and claviform all obsolete, merged in the basal suffusion; reniforrn x-shaped, suffused, dark fuscous; second line slender, whitish, dark-margined, moderately curved; subterminal slender, whitish, not touching second line : cilia whitish, basal third and a posterior line dark greyish-fuscous. Hindwings 1 2/5, ochreous-grey-whitish; lunule distinct, dark grey; hindmargin narrowly suffused with dark grey; cilia white, with a dark grey line.

This species is variable in the intensity of ground colour on its forewings as well as the shading at the tips of its hindwings.

== Distribution ==
It is endemic to New Zealand. This species has been recorded in the North and South Islands at elevations from sea level up to approximately 1350 m.

== Habitat and hosts ==
This species is known to inhabit lowland to montane areas. It has also been observed in lowland podocarp/hardwood forest.

== Behaviour ==
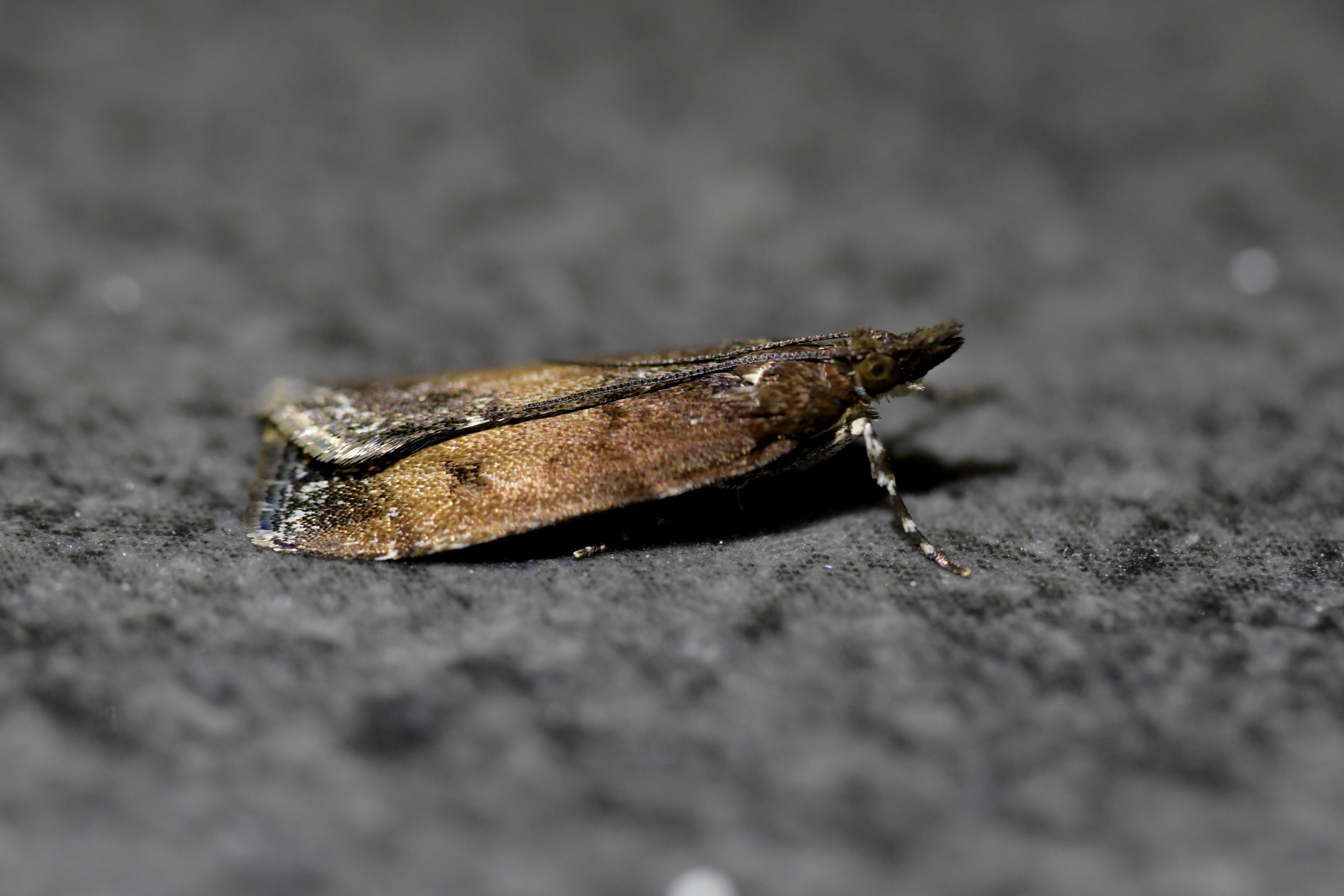
E. asterisca at rest.

Adults are on wing from between December until March but has also been recorded in October and November. Adults are attracted to light and have been known to be collected with the use of light as well as sugar traps.
