= Podocarpus pseudobracteatus =

Conservation status
- Least Concern (IUCN 3.1)

Scientific classification
- Kingdom: Plantae
- Clade: Tracheophytes
- Clade: Gymnosperms
- Division: Pinophyta
- Class: Pinopsida
- Order: Araucariales
- Family: Podocarpaceae
- Genus: Podocarpus
- Species: P. pseudobracteatus

Binomial name
- Podocarpus pseudobracteatus de Laub.

Varieties
- Podocarpus pseudobracteatus var. pseudobracteatus; Podocarpus pseudobracteatus var. sicaris de Laub.

Species of conifer

Podocarpus pseudobracteatus is a species of conifer in the family Podocarpaceae. It is a tree endemic to the island of New Guinea, which divided between Indonesia and Papua New Guinea.

The species was described by David John de Laubenfels n 1980. Two varieties are accepted:

- Podocarpus pseudobracteatus var. pseudobracteatus
- Podocarpus pseudobracteatus var. sicaris de Laub.
