= Podocarpus spathoides =

Conservation status
- Data Deficient (IUCN 3.1)

Scientific classification
- Kingdom: Plantae
- Clade: Tracheophytes
- Clade: Gymnosperms
- Division: Pinophyta
- Class: Pinopsida
- Order: Araucariales
- Family: Podocarpaceae
- Genus: Podocarpus
- Species: P. spathoides

Binomial name
- Podocarpus spathoides de Laub.

Species of conifer

Podocarpus spathoides is a species of conifer in the family Podocarpaceae. It is a shrub or tree endemic to Mount Ledang in Peninsular Malaysia.
