= Podocarpus acuminatus =

Conservation status
- Near Threatened (IUCN 3.1)

Scientific classification
- Kingdom: Plantae
- Clade: Tracheophytes
- Clade: Gymnosperms
- Division: Pinophyta
- Class: Pinopsida
- Order: Araucariales
- Family: Podocarpaceae
- Genus: Podocarpus
- Species: P. acuminatus

Binomial name
- Podocarpus acuminatus de Laub.

Species of conifer

Podocarpus acuminatus is a species of conifer in the family Podocarpaceae. It is a tree native to northern Brazil and southern Venezuela. The species is known only from the Serra de Neblina on the Brazil–Venezuela border and Amurí-tepui in Venezuela. Both are tepuis, flat-topped steep-sided mountains which rise above the surrounding plateau. It grows among rocks in high montane tropical rain forest and cloud forest from 1,900 to 2,400 metres elevation.

The species was described by David John de Laubenfels in 1992.
