= Podocarpus micropedunculatus =

Conservation status
- Near Threatened (IUCN 3.1)

Scientific classification
- Kingdom: Plantae
- Clade: Tracheophytes
- Clade: Gymnosperms
- Division: Pinophyta
- Class: Pinopsida
- Order: Araucariales
- Family: Podocarpaceae
- Genus: Podocarpus
- Species: P. micropedunculatus

Binomial name
- Podocarpus micropedunculatus de Laub.

Species of conifer

Podocarpus micropedunculatus is a species of conifer in the family Podocarpaceae. It is native to northern lowlands of Borneo, occurring in Brunei, Sabah and Sarawak states of Malaysia, and possibly the Indonesian portion of the island.

Podocarpus micropedunculatus is typically a small tree or shrub. It can reproduce from rhizomes.

Podocarpus micropedunculatus is typically found in the understorey of lowland Agathis forests. Other associated trees include Dryobalanops rappa and Shorea albida.
