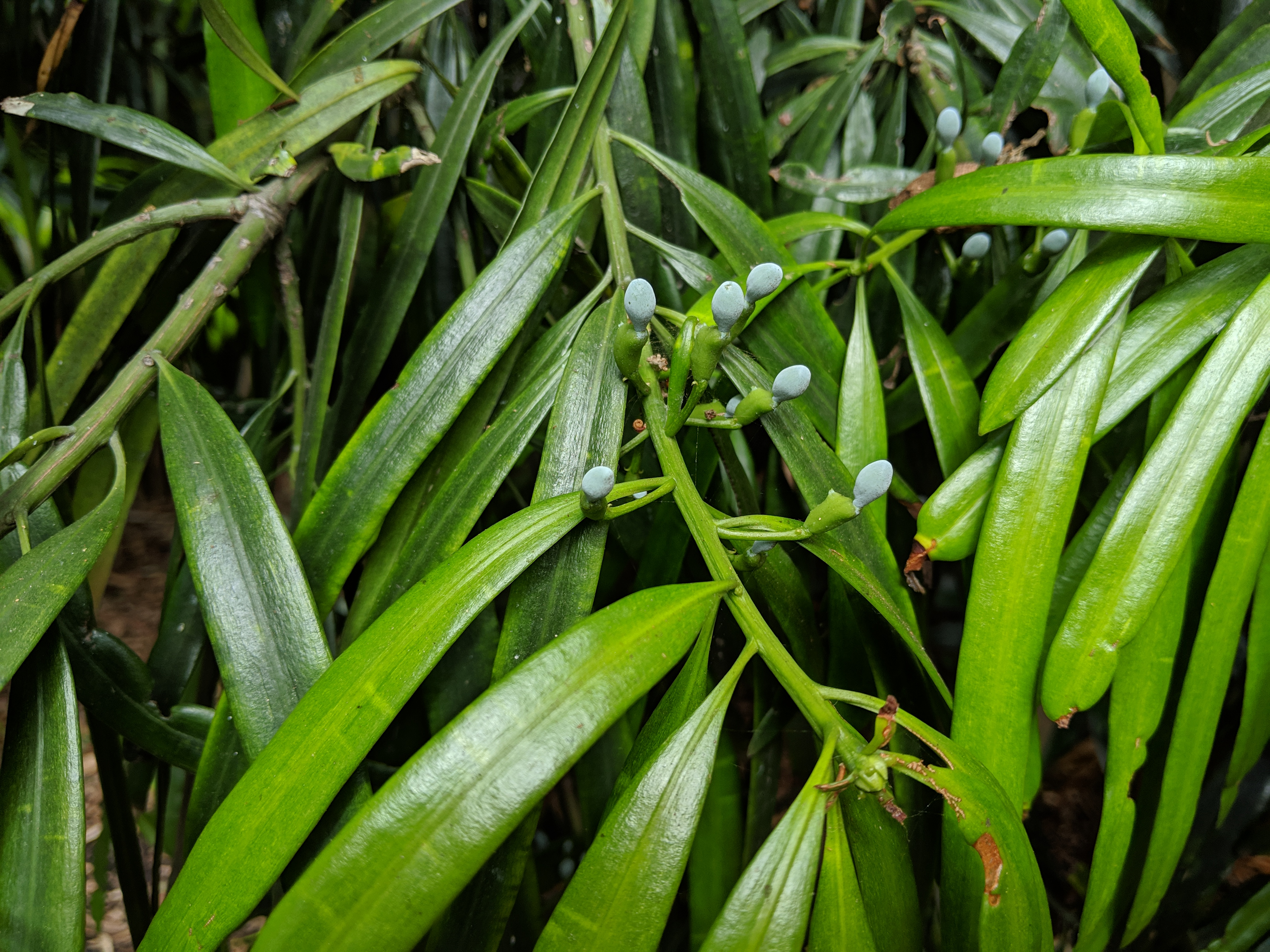

Conservation status
- Least Concern (IUCN 3.1)

Scientific classification
- Kingdom: Plantae
- Clade: Tracheophytes
- Clade: Gymnospermae
- Division: Pinophyta
- Class: Pinopsida
- Order: Araucariales
- Family: Podocarpaceae
- Genus: Podocarpus
- Species: P. grayae

Binomial name
- Podocarpus grayae de Laub.

= Podocarpus grayae =

Species of conifer

Podocarpus grayae is a species of conifer in the family Podocarpaceae, which is endemic to Australia. It is found only in the Northern Territory and Queensland.

== Taxonomy and naming ==
Podocarpus grayae was first described in 1985 by David John de Laubenfels, who gave it the specific epithet, grayii, to honour Netta Elizabeth Gray (1913 - 1970). However, because Netta was a woman, the name was changed to grayae to accord with ICN Art. 60.8 of the Shenzhen Code, 2018.
