= Podocarpus degeneri =

Conservation status
- Least Concern (IUCN 3.1)

Scientific classification
- Kingdom: Plantae
- Clade: Tracheophytes
- Clade: Gymnosperms
- Division: Pinophyta
- Class: Pinopsida
- Order: Araucariales
- Family: Podocarpaceae
- Genus: Podocarpus
- Species: P. degeneri

Binomial name
- Podocarpus degeneri (N.E.Gray) de Laub. (1984)

Synonyms
- Margbensonia degeneri (N.E.Gray) A.V.Bobrov & Melikyan (1998); Podocarpus neriifolius var. degeneri N.E.Gray (1958)

Species of conifer

Podocarpus degeneri is a species of conifer in the family Podocarpaceae. It is a small tree endemic to Fiji, where it is native to the islands of Viti Levu and Vanua Levu. It grows in moist forests from 40 to 1,050 metres elevation.
