= Podocarpus subtropicalis =

Conservation status
- Data Deficient (IUCN 3.1)

Scientific classification
- Kingdom: Plantae
- Clade: Tracheophytes
- Clade: Gymnosperms
- Division: Pinophyta
- Class: Pinopsida
- Order: Araucariales
- Family: Podocarpaceae
- Genus: Podocarpus
- Species: P. subtropicalis

Binomial name
- Podocarpus subtropicalis de Laub.

Synonyms
- Podocarpus subtropicalis var. medogensis Silba; Podocarpus subtropicalis subsp. medogensis (Silba) Silba

Species of conifer

Podocarpus subtropicalis is a species of conifer in the family Podocarpaceae. It is native to China.
