= Podocarpus transiens =

Conservation status
- Endangered (IUCN 3.1)

Scientific classification
- Kingdom: Plantae
- Clade: Tracheophytes
- Clade: Gymnosperms
- Division: Pinophyta
- Class: Pinopsida
- Order: Araucariales
- Family: Podocarpaceae
- Genus: Podocarpus
- Species: P. transiens

Binomial name
- Podocarpus transiens (Pilg.) de Laub.

Synonyms
- Podocarpus lambertii var. transiens Pilg.; Podocarpus transiens var. harleyi Silba; Podocarpus transiens subsp. harleyi (Silba) Silba

Species of conifer

Podocarpus transiens is a species of conifer in the family Podocarpaceae. It is a tree endemic to eastern, southern, and west-central Brazil. It grows in interior montane moist forest enclaves surrounded by drier campo rupestre grassland, and in Atlantic Forest remnants closer to the Atlantic coast, from 1,000 to 1,780 metres elevation.

Robert Knud Friedrich Pilger first described it a variety of Podocarpus lambertii, P. l. var. transiens by in 1903. In 1984 David John de Laubenfels described it as the distinct species P. transiens.
