= Podocarpus lophatus =

Conservation status
- Vulnerable (IUCN 3.1)

Scientific classification
- Kingdom: Plantae
- Clade: Tracheophytes
- Clade: Gymnosperms
- Division: Pinophyta
- Class: Pinopsida
- Order: Araucariales
- Family: Podocarpaceae
- Genus: Podocarpus
- Species: P. lophatus

Binomial name
- Podocarpus lophatus de Laub.

Species of conifer

Podocarpus lophatus is a species of conifer in the family Podocarpaceae. It is a tree endemic to the Philippines. It is threatened by habitat loss.
