= Podocarpus fasciculus =

Conservation status
- Vulnerable (IUCN 3.1)

Scientific classification
- Kingdom: Plantae
- Clade: Tracheophytes
- Clade: Gymnospermae
- Division: Pinophyta
- Class: Pinopsida
- Order: Araucariales
- Family: Podocarpaceae
- Genus: Podocarpus
- Species: P. fasciculus

Binomial name
- Podocarpus fasciculus de Laub.

Synonyms
- Podocarpus costalis var. muroii Silba; Podocarpus costalis subsp. muroii (Silba) Silba; Podocarpus macrophyllus f. grandifolius Pilg. Podocarpus macrophyllus var. liukiuensis Warb.

Species of conifer

Podocarpus fasciculus is a species of conifer in the family Podocarpaceae. It is native to Japan, the Ryukyu Islands, and Taiwan. It is threatened by habitat loss.
