= Podocarpus aracensis =

Conservation status
- Least Concern (IUCN 3.1)

Scientific classification
- Kingdom: Plantae
- Clade: Tracheophytes
- Clade: Gymnosperms
- Division: Pinophyta
- Class: Pinopsida
- Order: Araucariales
- Family: Podocarpaceae
- Genus: Podocarpus
- Species: P. aracensis

Binomial name
- Podocarpus aracensis de Laub. & Silba

Species of conifer

Podocarpus aracensis is a species of conifer in the family Podocarpaceae. It is a tree native to northern Brazil and southern Venezuela. It is known from two tepuis, Serra do Aracá in the Brazilian state of Amazonas, and Cerro Yaví in the Venezuelan state of Amazonas. Tepuis are steep-sided, flat-topped sandstone mountains which rise above the surrounding plateau. Podocarpus aracensis grows along streams in dwarf forest or shrub vegetation from 1,200 to 2,100 metres elevation.

The species was described by David John de Laubenfels and John Silba in 1988.
