= Podocarpus celatus =

Conservation status
- Least Concern (IUCN 3.1)

Scientific classification
- Kingdom: Plantae
- Clade: Tracheophytes
- Clade: Gymnosperms
- Division: Pinophyta
- Class: Pinopsida
- Order: Araucariales
- Family: Podocarpaceae
- Genus: Podocarpus
- Species: P. celatus

Binomial name
- Podocarpus celatus de Laub.

Species of conifer

Podocarpus celatus is a species of conifer in the family Podocarpaceae. It is native to the Amazon rainforest.

== Description ==
The species grows as a tree up to 10–25 m tall with narrowly elliptic or oblong leaves, 5–15 cm long and 1–2 cm wide, male cones 2–3 cm long; seeds 5–6 mm long.

== Distribution and habitat ==
Podocarpus celatus grows in lowland rainforests and low montane rainforests between 130 m and 1400 m of elevation in Brazil, Colombia, Peru, Ecuador, Venezuela and Bolivia.

== Ecology ==
This species grows on poor soil types: lateritic, sandstone and white sand.
