= Podocarpus levis =

Conservation status
- Least Concern (IUCN 3.1)

Scientific classification
- Kingdom: Plantae
- Clade: Tracheophytes
- Clade: Gymnosperms
- Division: Pinophyta
- Class: Pinopsida
- Order: Araucariales
- Family: Podocarpaceae
- Genus: Podocarpus
- Species: P. levis

Binomial name
- Podocarpus levis de Laub.

Species of conifer

Podocarpus levis is a species of conifer in the family Podocarpaceae. It is native to Borneo, Sulawesi, the Maluku Islands, and western New Guinea, in the countries of Brunei, Indonesia, and Malaysia.

The species was described by David John de Laubenfels in 1978.
