= Podocarpus rubens =

Conservation status
- Least Concern (IUCN 3.1)

Scientific classification
- Kingdom: Plantae
- Clade: Tracheophytes
- Clade: Gymnosperms
- Division: Pinophyta
- Class: Pinopsida
- Order: Araucariales
- Family: Podocarpaceae
- Genus: Podocarpus
- Species: P. rubens

Binomial name
- Podocarpus rubens de Laub.

Synonyms
- Podocarpus indonesiensis de Laub. & Silba

Species of conifer

Podocarpus rubens is a species of conifer in the family Podocarpaceae. It is native to portions of Malesia (Borneo, the Lesser Sunda Islands, Maluku Islands, Sulawesi, and Sumatra) and Papuasia (New Guinea and the Bismarck Archipelago), which in the countries Indonesia, Malaysia, Papua New Guinea, and Timor-Leste.
