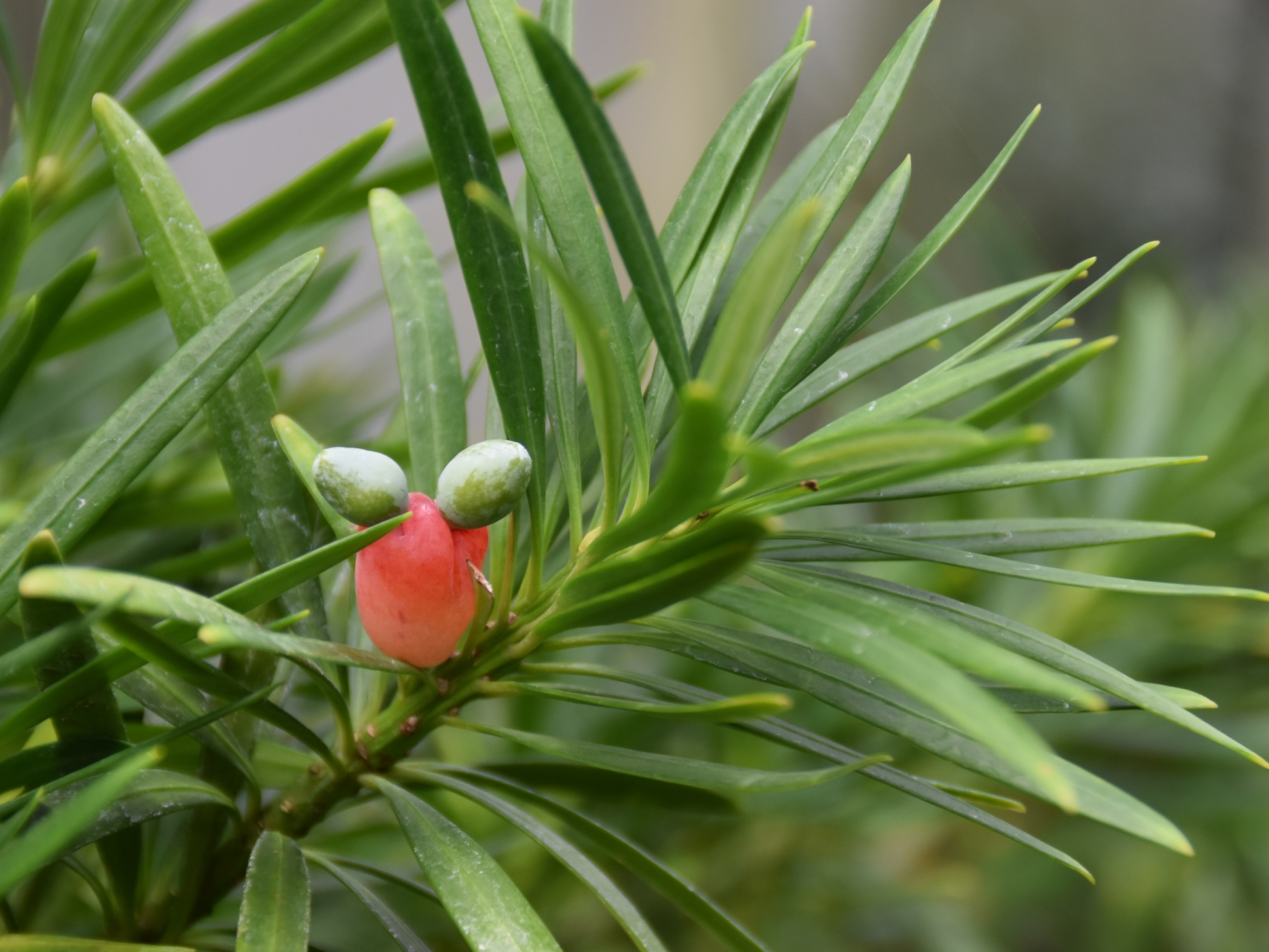

Conservation status
- Endangered (IUCN 3.1)

Scientific classification
- Kingdom: Plantae
- Clade: Tracheophytes
- Clade: Gymnosperms
- Division: Pinophyta
- Class: Pinopsida
- Order: Araucariales
- Family: Podocarpaceae
- Genus: Podocarpus
- Species: P. macrocarpus

Binomial name
- Podocarpus macrocarpus de Laub.

= Podocarpus macrocarpus =

Species of conifer

Podocarpus macrocarpus is a species of conifer in the family Podocarpaceae. It is endemic to the Philippines.
