= Podocarpus brasiliensis =

Conservation status
- Least Concern (IUCN 3.1)

Scientific classification
- Kingdom: Plantae
- Clade: Tracheophytes
- Clade: Gymnosperms
- Division: Pinophyta
- Class: Pinopsida
- Order: Araucariales
- Family: Podocarpaceae
- Genus: Podocarpus
- Species: P. brasiliensis

Binomial name
- Podocarpus brasiliensis de Laub.

Synonyms
- Podocarpus barretoi de Laub. & Silba

Species of conifer

Podocarpus brasiliensis is a species of conifer in the family Podocarpaceae. It is a tree native to Venezuela and central and northern Brazil. It is native to the tepuis, steep-sided flat-topped mountains at the northern edge of the Amazon Basin in southern Venezuela and northern Brazil, where it grows in dwarf montane forest above sandstone bluffs, and in the transition between the tepui forests and the taller evergreen lowland forests. It is also native to the Cerrado savannas of central Brazil, on the Brazilian Plateau south of the Amazon Basin, where it grows in narrow strips of gallery forest along streams with access to year-round groundwater. The species has been recorded from 800 to 1,600 metres elevation.

The species was described by David John de Laubenfels in 1982.
