= P. sylvestris =

P. sylvestris may refer to:

- Phoenix sylvestris, the silver date palm or sugar date palm, a flowering plant species
- Pinus sylvestris, the Scots pine, a pine species native to Europe and Asia
- Podocarpus sylvestris, a conifer species found only in New Caledonia
- Pogonomys sylvestris, the gray-bellied tree mouse, a rodent species found only in Papua New Guinea
