= Podocarpus atjehensis =

Conservation status
- Near Threatened (IUCN 3.1)

Scientific classification
- Kingdom: Plantae
- Clade: Tracheophytes
- Clade: Gymnosperms
- Division: Pinophyta
- Class: Pinopsida
- Order: Araucariales
- Family: Podocarpaceae
- Genus: Podocarpus
- Species: P. atjehensis

Binomial name
- Podocarpus atjehensis (Wasscher) de Laub.

Synonyms
- Margbensonia atjehensis (Wasscher) A.V.Bobrov & Melikyan; Podocarpus neriifolius var. atjehensis Wasscher; Podocarpus neriifolius var. membranaceus Wasscher

Species of conifer

Podocarpus atjehensis is a species of conifer in the family Podocarpaceae. It is native to Indonesia, where it is found in Sumatra, Sulawesi, and the Wissel Lakes area of Western New Guinea.
