= Podocarpus polyspermus =

Conservation status
- Vulnerable (IUCN 3.1)

Scientific classification
- Kingdom: Plantae
- Clade: Tracheophytes
- Clade: Gymnosperms
- Division: Pinophyta
- Class: Pinopsida
- Order: Araucariales
- Family: Podocarpaceae
- Genus: Podocarpus
- Species: P. polyspermus

Binomial name
- Podocarpus polyspermus de Laub.

Species of conifer

Podocarpus polyspermus is a species of conifer in the family Podocarpaceae. It is a tree endemic to New Caledonia.

The species was described by David John de Laubenfels in 1972.
