= Podocarpus glaucus =

Conservation status
- Least Concern (IUCN 3.1)

Scientific classification
- Kingdom: Plantae
- Clade: Tracheophytes
- Clade: Gymnosperms
- Division: Pinophyta
- Class: Pinopsida
- Order: Araucariales
- Family: Podocarpaceae
- Genus: Podocarpus
- Species: P. glaucus

Binomial name
- Podocarpus glaucus Foxw.

Species of conifer

Podocarpus glaucus is a species of conifer in the family Podocarpaceae. It is native to Indonesia (the Maluku Islands, Sulawesi, and Western New Guinea) Papua New Guinea (eastern New Guinea, the Bismarck Archipelago, and Manus in the Admiralty Islands), the Philippines (Mindoro), and the Solomon Islands. It grows as a decumbent or erect shrub in montane stunted mossy forest on mountain ridges up to 2,800 metres elevation. It occasionally grows in taller submontane forest down to 600 metres elevation, where it is a subcanopy tree.
