= Podocarpus teysmannii =

Conservation status
- Near Threatened (IUCN 3.1)

Scientific classification
- Kingdom: Plantae
- Clade: Tracheophytes
- Clade: Gymnospermae
- Division: Pinophyta
- Class: Pinopsida
- Order: Araucariales
- Family: Podocarpaceae
- Genus: Podocarpus
- Species: P. teysmannii

Binomial name
- Podocarpus teysmannii Miq.

Synonyms
- Nageia teysmannii (Miq.) Kuntze; Podocarpus epiphyticus de Laub. & Silba; Podocarpus neriifolius var. polyanthus Wasscher; Podocarpus neriifolius var. teysmannii (Miq.) Wasscher; Podocarpus polyanthus (Wasscher) Gaussen

Species of conifer

Podocarpus teysmannii is a species of conifer in the family Podocarpaceae. It is a tree native to Borneo, Sumatra, Java, Peninsular Malaysia, and northern Myanmar.

Podocarpus teysmannii is an understory or canopy tree, growing up to 35 meters tall. It grows in both primary and secondary rain forest from sea level up to 800 metres elevation, and occasionally up to 1,350 metres elevation. It often grows on poor, sandy, or rocky soils, where it generally doesn't reach large size. In Sabah grows on coastal sandy ridges or hills with the broadleaved dipterocarp tree Dryobalanops rappa. In the Mount Kinabalu area of Sabah it was collected in kerangas forest dominated by Agathis sp.
