= Podocarpus madagascariensis =

Conservation status
- Near Threatened (IUCN 3.1)

Scientific classification
- Kingdom: Plantae
- Clade: Tracheophytes
- Clade: Gymnosperms
- Division: Pinophyta
- Class: Pinopsida
- Order: Araucariales
- Family: Podocarpaceae
- Genus: Podocarpus
- Species: P. madagascariensis

Binomial name
- Podocarpus madagascariensis Baker

Varieties
- Podocarpus madagascariensis var. madagascariensis; Podocarpus madagascariensis var. procerus de Laub.; Podocarpus madagascariensis var. rotundus L.Laurent

Synonyms
- Nageia madagascariensis (Baker) Kuntze

Species of conifer

Podocarpus madagascariensis is a species of conifer in the family Podocarpaceae. It is a tree endemic to Madagascar.

It is found in moist forests and shrublands in eastern and central Madagascar, from sea level up to 2,400 meters elevation. It grows in the Madagascar lowland forests and montane Madagascar subhumid forests ecoregions, mostly in broadleaved evergreen forests. In the subhumid forests ecoregion, it is found in humid evergreen forest, montane sclerophyllous forest, and ridgetop shrublands. It is generally a canopy tree, and in the lowland forests it grow up to 20 to 25 meters high. On exposed ridges and high-elevation shrublands it forms a stunted tree or shrub.

The species was described by John Gilbert Baker in 1885. Three varieties are recognized:

- Podocarpus madagascariensis var. madagascariensis
- Podocarpus madagascariensis var. procerus de Laub.
- Podocarpus madagascariensis var. rotundus L.Laurent
