= Podocarpus archboldii =

Conservation status
- Vulnerable (IUCN 3.1)

Scientific classification
- Kingdom: Plantae
- Clade: Tracheophytes
- Clade: Gymnosperms
- Division: Pinophyta
- Class: Pinopsida
- Order: Araucariales
- Family: Podocarpaceae
- Genus: Podocarpus
- Species: P. archboldii

Binomial name
- Podocarpus archboldii N.E.Gray

Synonyms
- Margbensonia archboldii (N.E.Gray) A.V.Bobrov & Melikyan; Podocarpus crassigemmis de Laub.

Species of conifer

Podocarpus archboldii is a species of conifer in the family Podocarpaceae. It is a tree native to the island of New Guinea, which is divided between Indonesia and Papua New Guinea, and to the island of New Britain in the Bismarck Archipelago of Papua New Guinea. It grows in humid montane tropical forests from 720 to 2,600 metres elevation.

The species was described by Netta Elizabeth Gray in 1958.
