= Podocarpus forrestii =

Scientific classification
- Kingdom: Plantae
- Clade: Tracheophytes
- Clade: Gymnosperms
- Division: Pinophyta
- Class: Pinopsida
- Order: Araucariales
- Family: Podocarpaceae
- Genus: Podocarpus
- Species: P. forrestii

Binomial name
- Podocarpus forrestii Craib & W.W.Sm

Synonyms
- Margbensonia forrestii (Craib & W.W.Sm.) A.V.Bobrov & Melikyan; Podocarpus macrophyllus subsp. forrestii (Craib & W.W.Sm.) Silba

Conifer species

Podocarpus forrestii is a rare species of conifer in the family Podocarpaceae. It is endemic to Yunnan Province in south-central China.

== Description ==
The species is a large shrub or small tree that can reach heights up to 3.5 m tall. It has stiff branches with dense leafy crown. Foliage buds are small and ovate. Leaves are elliptic/linear-elliptic, with the size being 2-9 cm × 6-10 mm, has a prominent midvein 0.5-1 mm wide. Seed cones are usually solitary in the leaf axils.
