= Podocarpus pilgeri =

Conservation status
- Least Concern (IUCN 3.1)

Scientific classification
- Kingdom: Plantae
- Clade: Tracheophytes
- Clade: Gymnosperms
- Division: Pinophyta
- Class: Pinopsida
- Order: Araucariales
- Family: Podocarpaceae
- Genus: Podocarpus
- Species: P. pilgeri

Binomial name
- Podocarpus pilgeri Foxw.

Synonyms
- Podocarpus celebicus Warb., nom. illeg. homonym. post.; Podocarpus pilgeri var. thailandensis Gaussen, without type.; Podocarpus pilgeri subsp. wangii (C.C.Chang) Silba; Podocarpus schlechteri Pilg.; Podocarpus wangii C.C.Chang

Species of conifer

Podocarpus pilgeri is a species of conifer in the family Podocarpaceae. It is a small to medium-sized tree that is native to eastern Indochina (Cambodia, Laos, and Vietnam), southern China (Guangxi and Hainan), the Philippines, Borneo, Sulawesi, the Maluku Islands, and New Guinea. Its timber is hard and water-resistant.

Podocarpus wangii of southern China is often treated as synonym of P. pilgeri.
