= Podocarpus magnifolius =

Conservation status
- Least Concern (IUCN 3.1)

Scientific classification
- Kingdom: Plantae
- Clade: Tracheophytes
- Clade: Gymnosperms
- Division: Pinophyta
- Class: Pinopsida
- Order: Araucariales
- Family: Podocarpaceae
- Genus: Podocarpus
- Species: P. magnifolius

Binomial name
- Podocarpus magnifolius J.Buchholz & N.E.Gray

Species of conifer

Podocarpus magnifolius is a species of conifer in the family Podocarpaceae. It is a tree native to Bolivia, Colombia, Peru, Panama and Venezuela.

== Description ==
It grows up to 30 m tall with dark brown bark, elliptic to oblong, 3–29 cm long and 1.2–3 cm wide, apex acumiunate, base cuneate leaves. The male cones are axillary, sessile, solitary, up to 5 cm long. The ovules are borne on a receptacle of 1.2 cm long, at the end of a 1–2 cm long peduncle. Seeds are ovoid, bright red, and 1 cm long.

== Distribution and habitat ==
Podocarpus magnifolius can be found from Panama and eastern Venezuela south to Bolivia in montane and cloud forests from 850 to 2900 m.
