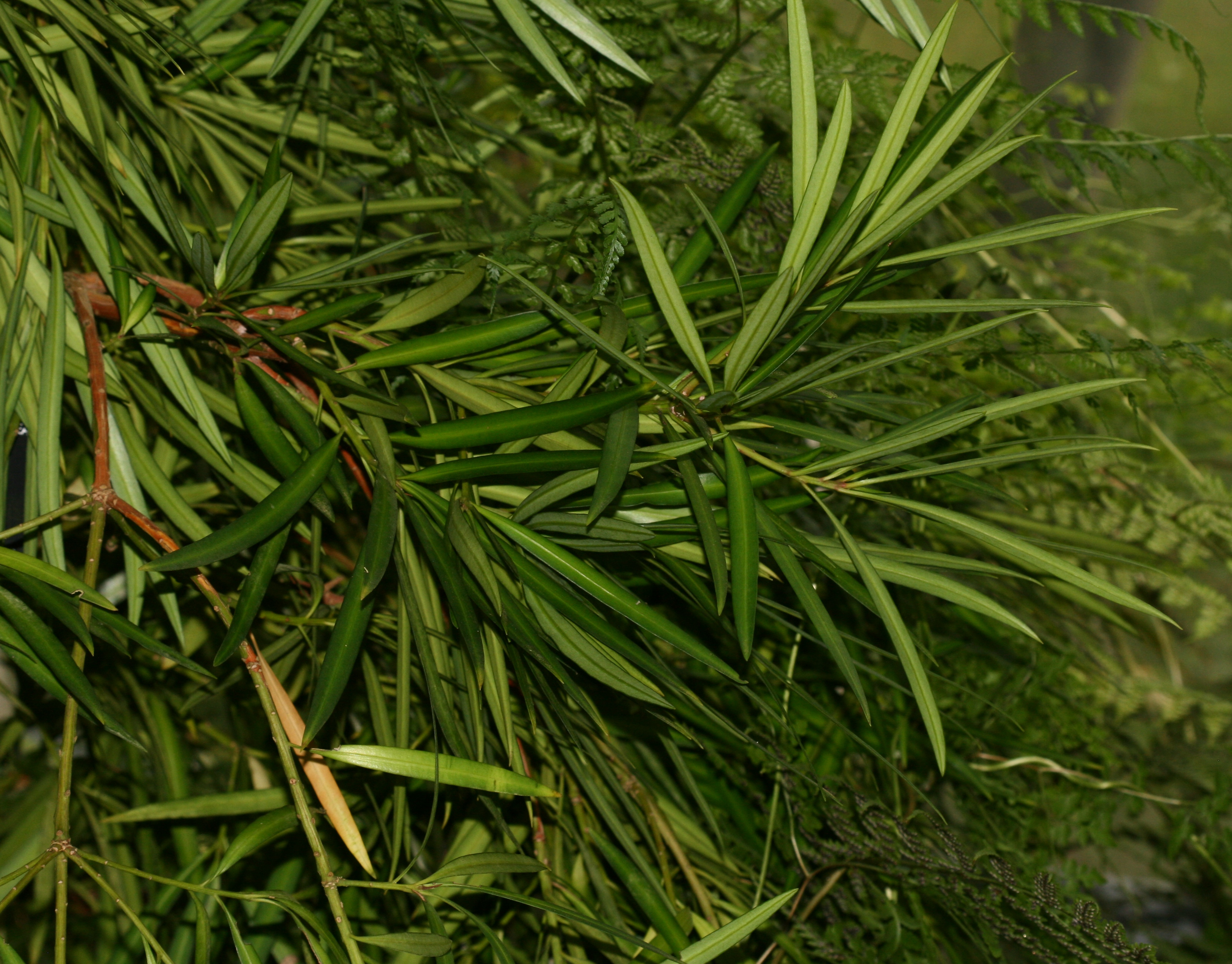

Conservation status
- Endangered (IUCN 3.1)

Scientific classification
- Kingdom: Plantae
- Clade: Tracheophytes
- Clade: Gymnosperms
- Division: Pinophyta
- Class: Pinopsida
- Order: Araucariales
- Family: Podocarpaceae
- Genus: Podocarpus
- Species: P. nakaii

Binomial name
- Podocarpus nakaii Hayata

Synonyms
- Podocarpus macrophyllus var. nakaii (Hayata) H.L.Li & H.Keng

= Podocarpus nakaii =

Species of conifer

Podocarpus nakaii is a species of conifer in the family Podocarpaceae. It is endemic to Taiwan, scattered in broad-leaf forests in the central part of the island. Ponesterone, which is similar to the insect moulting hormone ecdysone, is obtained from this plant. It was the first ecdysone isolated by Nkanishi et al.

According to the survey results of the sample area, there are about 100 Podocarpus nakaii trees per hectare. The diameter at breast height of the largest plant is about 30 cm, but nearly 90% of the trees have a diameter at breast height of less than 10 cm; the height of the trees is less than 10 meters. New leaf growth may sometimes be distinguished by its red color. Podocarpus nakaii is a shade-tolerant species that tends to grow near the forest floor. The young seedlings are protected by large trees.

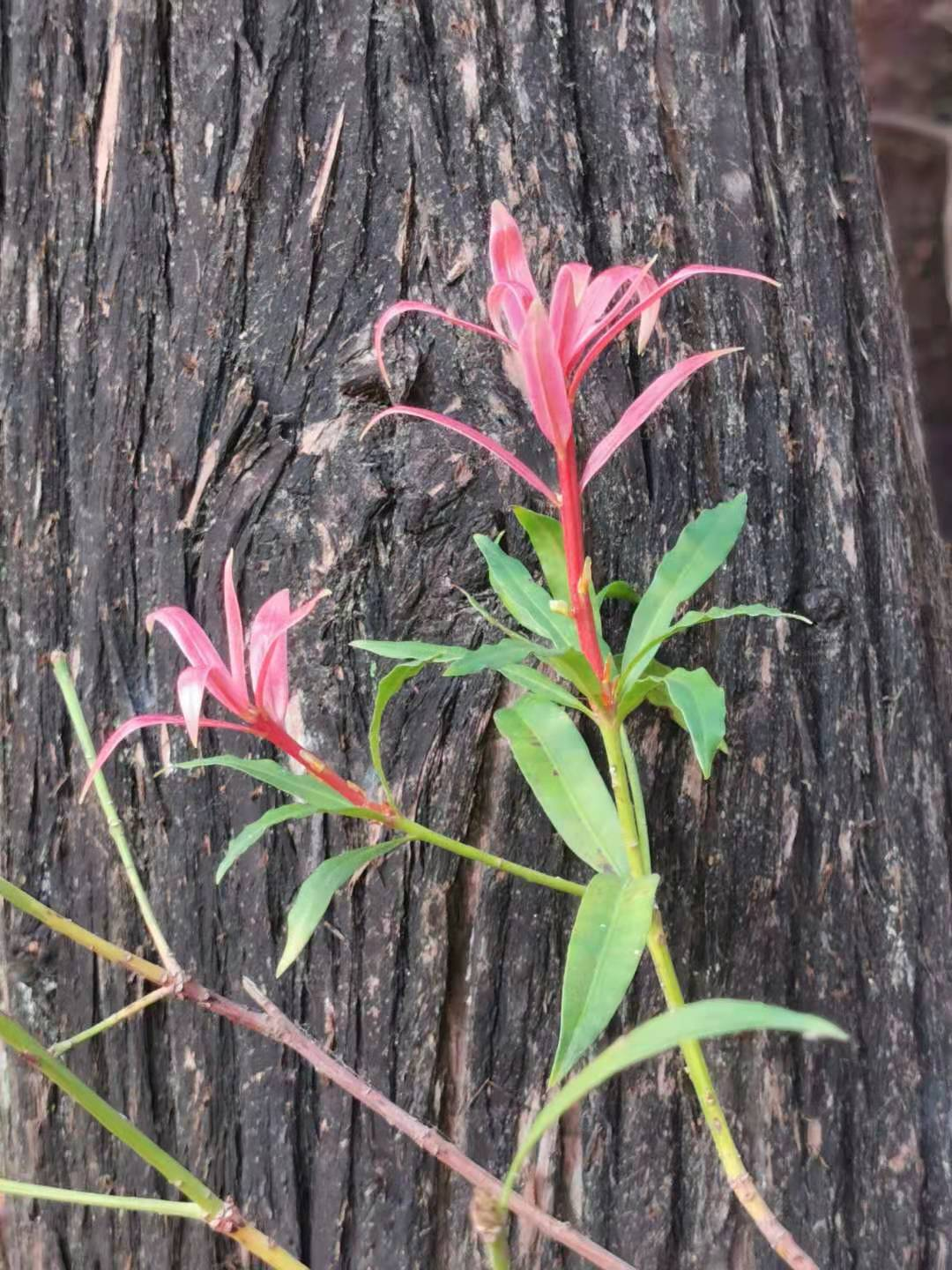
Emerging red leaves

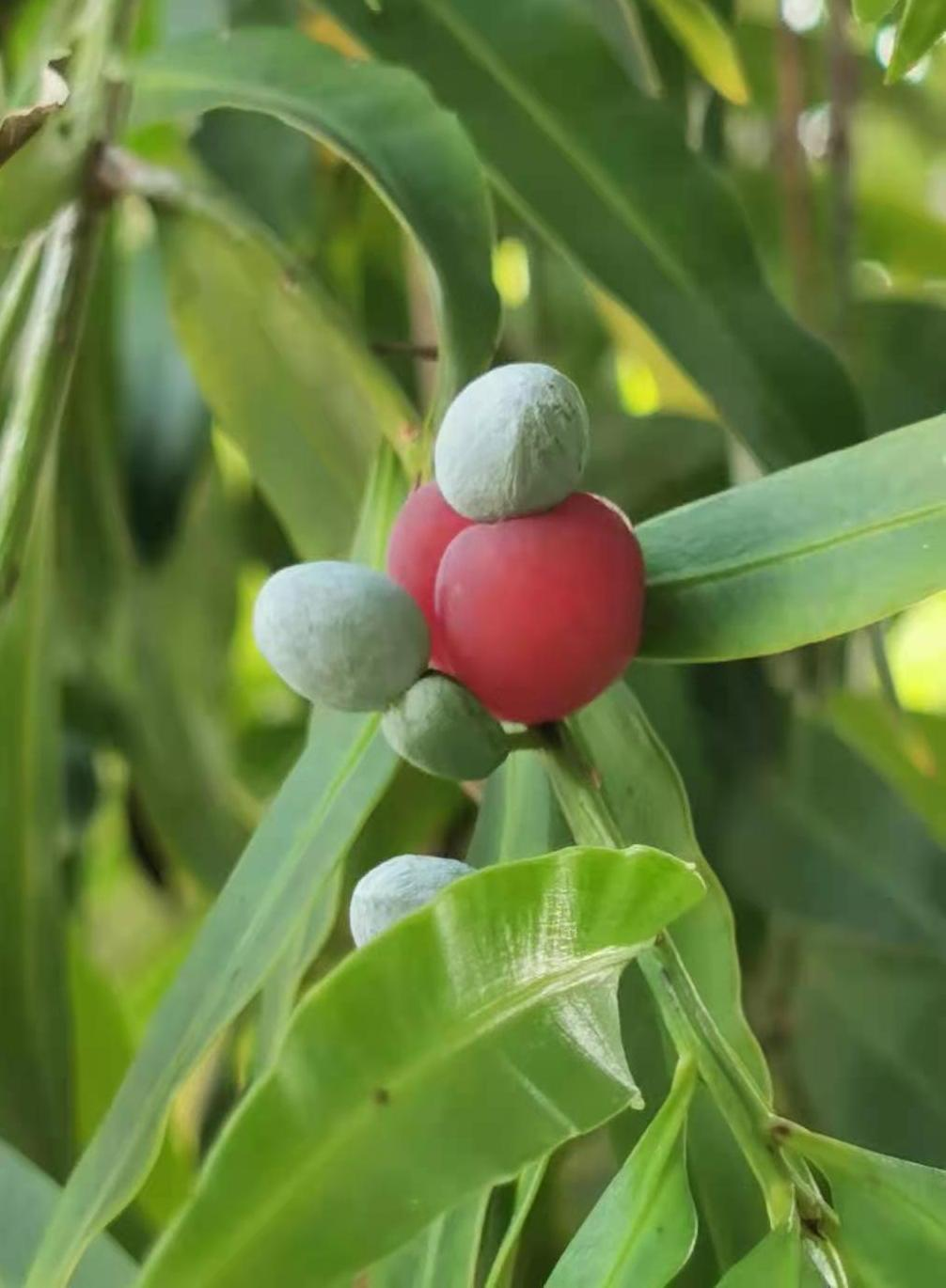
Peach-shaped receptacle and epimatium

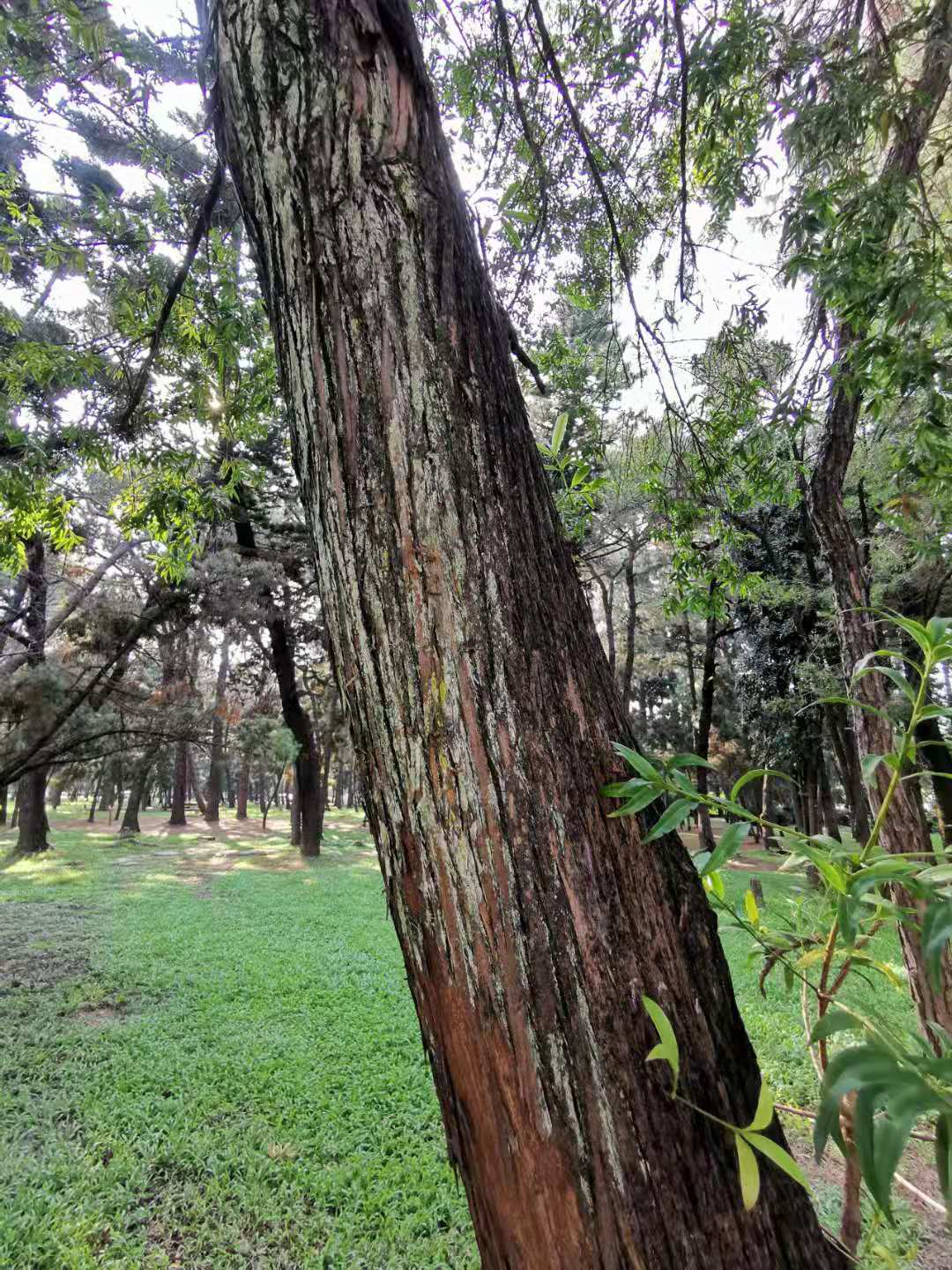
Bark

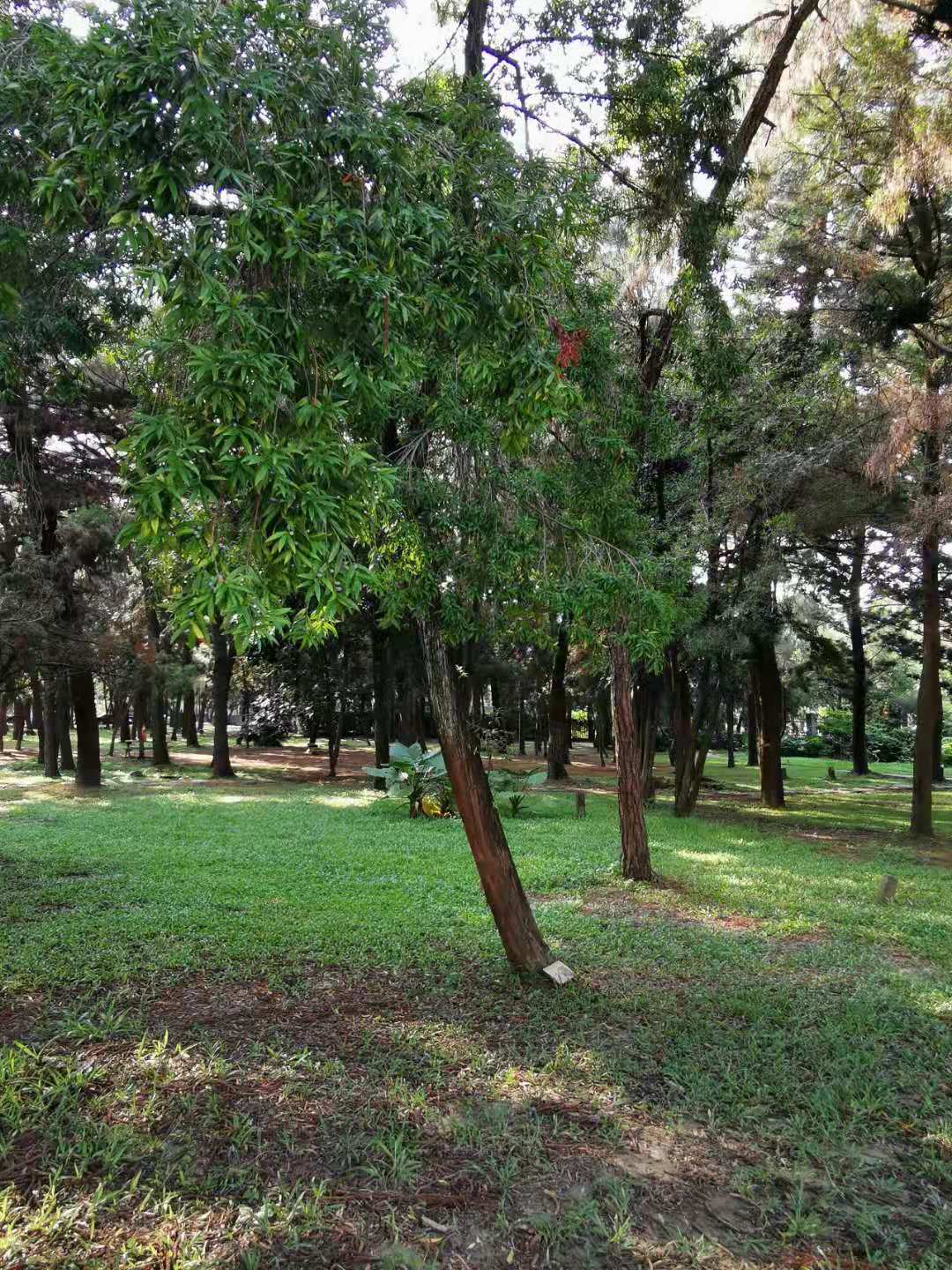
Plant
