= Podocarpus deflexus =

Conservation status
- Near Threatened (IUCN 3.1)

Scientific classification
- Kingdom: Plantae
- Clade: Tracheophytes
- Clade: Gymnosperms
- Division: Pinophyta
- Class: Pinopsida
- Order: Araucariales
- Family: Podocarpaceae
- Genus: Podocarpus
- Species: P. deflexus

Binomial name
- Podocarpus deflexus Ridl.

Species of conifer

Podocarpus deflexus is a species of conifer in the family Podocarpaceae. It is native to Peninsular Malaysia and Sumatra, Indonesia. It is threatened by habitat degradation.
