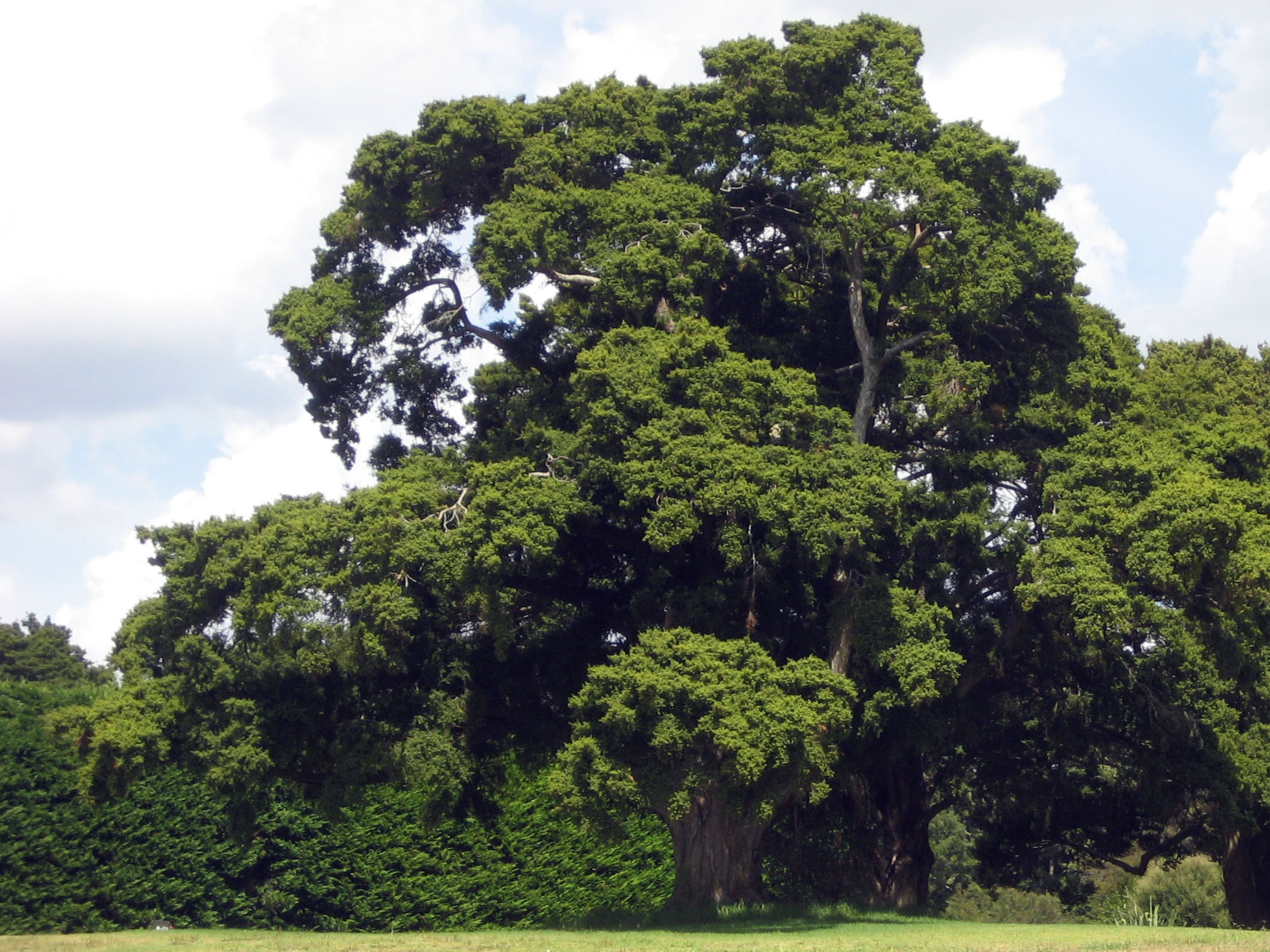
- Podocarpus totara

Scientific classification
- Kingdom: Plantae
- Clade: Tracheophytes
- Clade: Gymnosperms
- Division: Pinophyta
- Class: Pinopsida
- Order: Araucariales
- Family: Podocarpaceae
- Genus: Podocarpus; L'Hér ex Pers.

Type species
- Podocarpus elongatus L'Hér ex Pers.

Species
- 116, see text

Synonyms
- Margbensonia Bobrov & Melikian

= Podocarpus =

Podocarpus Temporal range: Cretaceous-Recent (Late Cretaceous-Holocene), 71.3–0 Ma

Genus of coniferous trees

Podocarpus (/ˌpoʊdəˈkɑːrpəs/) is a large genus of conifers, the most numerous and widely distributed of the family Podocarpaceae. Podocarpus species are shrubs or trees, usually from 1 to 25 m (3 to 82 ft) tall, known to reach 40 m (130 ft) at times. The cones have two to five fused cone scales, which form a fleshy, berry-like, brightly coloured receptacle at maturity. The fleshy cones attract birds, which then eat the cones and disperse the seeds in their droppings. Plants of the World Online accepts 116 species. Other authorities place 97 to 107 species in the genus depending on the circumscription of the species.

Species are cultivated as ornamental plants for parks and large gardens. The cultivar 'County Park Fire' has won the Royal Horticultural Society's Award of Garden Merit.

== Etymology ==
The name comes from Greek πούς poús meaning "foot" and καρπός karpós meaning "fruit".

=== Names ===
Common names for various species include "yellowwood" and "pine", as in the plum pine (Podocarpus elatus) or the Buddhist pine (Podocarpus macrophyllus).

== Description ==
Podocarpus species are woody conifers. They are generally trees, but may also be shrubs. The trees can reach a height of 40 metres (130 ft) at their tallest. Some shrubby species have a decumbent growth habit. The primary branches form pseudowhorls around the trunk. The bark can be scaly or fibrous and peeling with vertical strips. Terminal buds are distinctive with bud scales that are often imbricate and can be spreading.

The leaves are simple and flattened, and may be sessile or short petiolate. The phyllotaxis or leaf arrangement is spiral, and may be subopposite on some shoots. The leaves are usually linear-lanceolate or linear-elliptic in shape, though they can be broader lanceolate, ovate, or nearly elliptic in some species. Juvenile leaves are often larger than adult leaves, though similar in shape. The leaves are coriaceous and have a distinct midrib. The stomata are usually restricted to the abaxial or underside of the leaf, forming two stomatal bands around the midrib.

Podocarpus spp. are generally dioecious, with the male pollen cones and female seed cones borne on separate individual plants, but some species may be monoecious. The cones develop from axillary buds, and may be solitary or form clusters.

The pollen cones are long and catkin-like in shape. They may be sessile or short pedunculate. A pollen cone consists of a slender rachis with numerous spirally arranged microsporophylls around it. Each triangular microsporophyll has two basal pollen-producing pollen sacs. The pollen is bisaccate.

The seed cones are highly modified with the few cone scales swelling and fusing at maturity. The cones are pedunculate and often solitary. The seed cone consists of two to five cone scales of which only the uppermost one or rarely two nearest the apex of the cone are fertile. Each fertile scale usually has one apical ovule. The infertile basal scales fuse and swell to form a succulent, usually brightly colored receptacle. Each cone generally has only one seed, but may have two or rarely more. The seed is attached to the apex of the receptacle. The seed is entirely covered by a fleshy modified scale known as an epimatium. The epimatium is usually green, but may be bluish or reddish in some species.

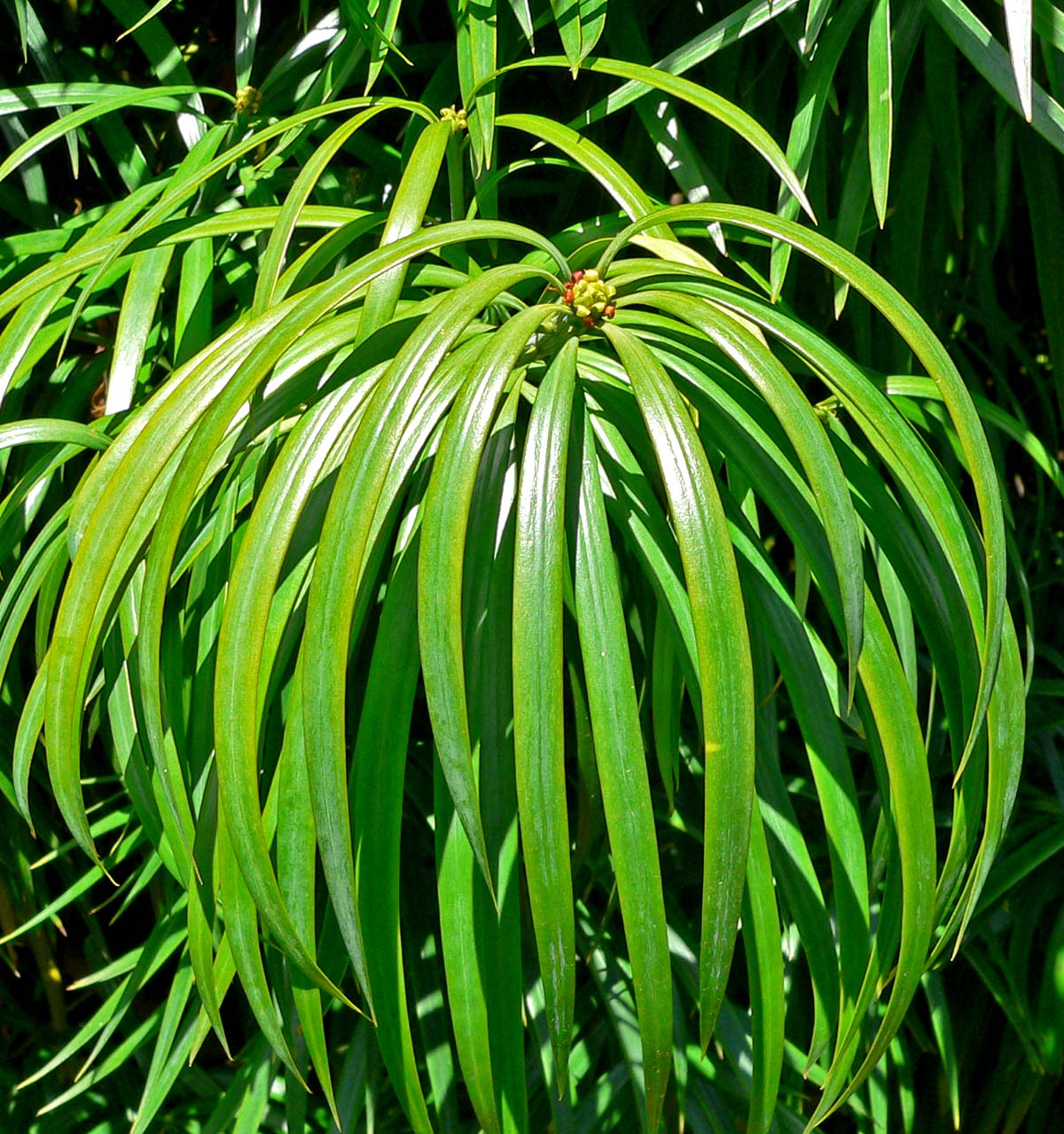
Leaves of P. henkelii

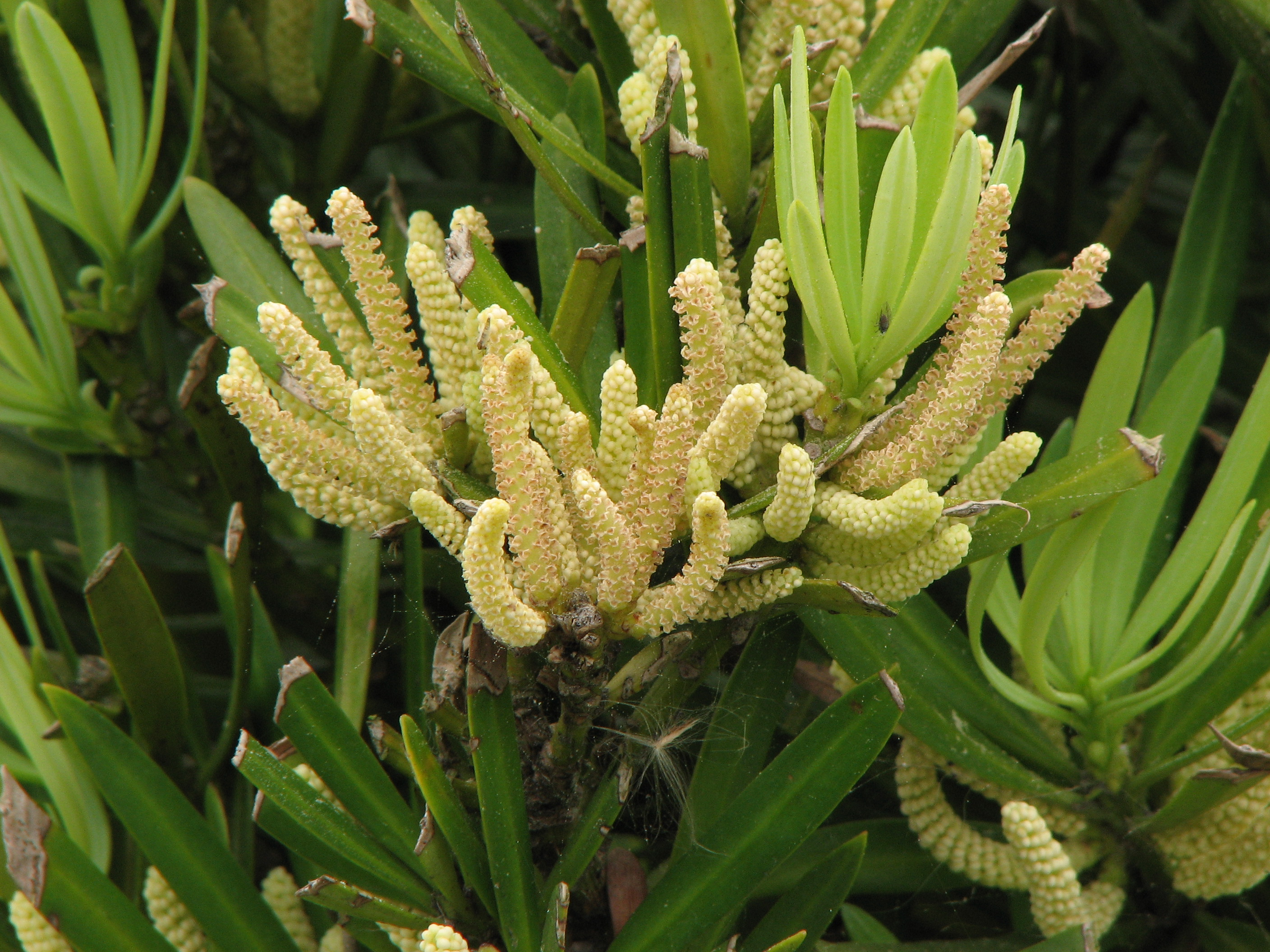
Male cones of P. macrophyllus grow in clusters.

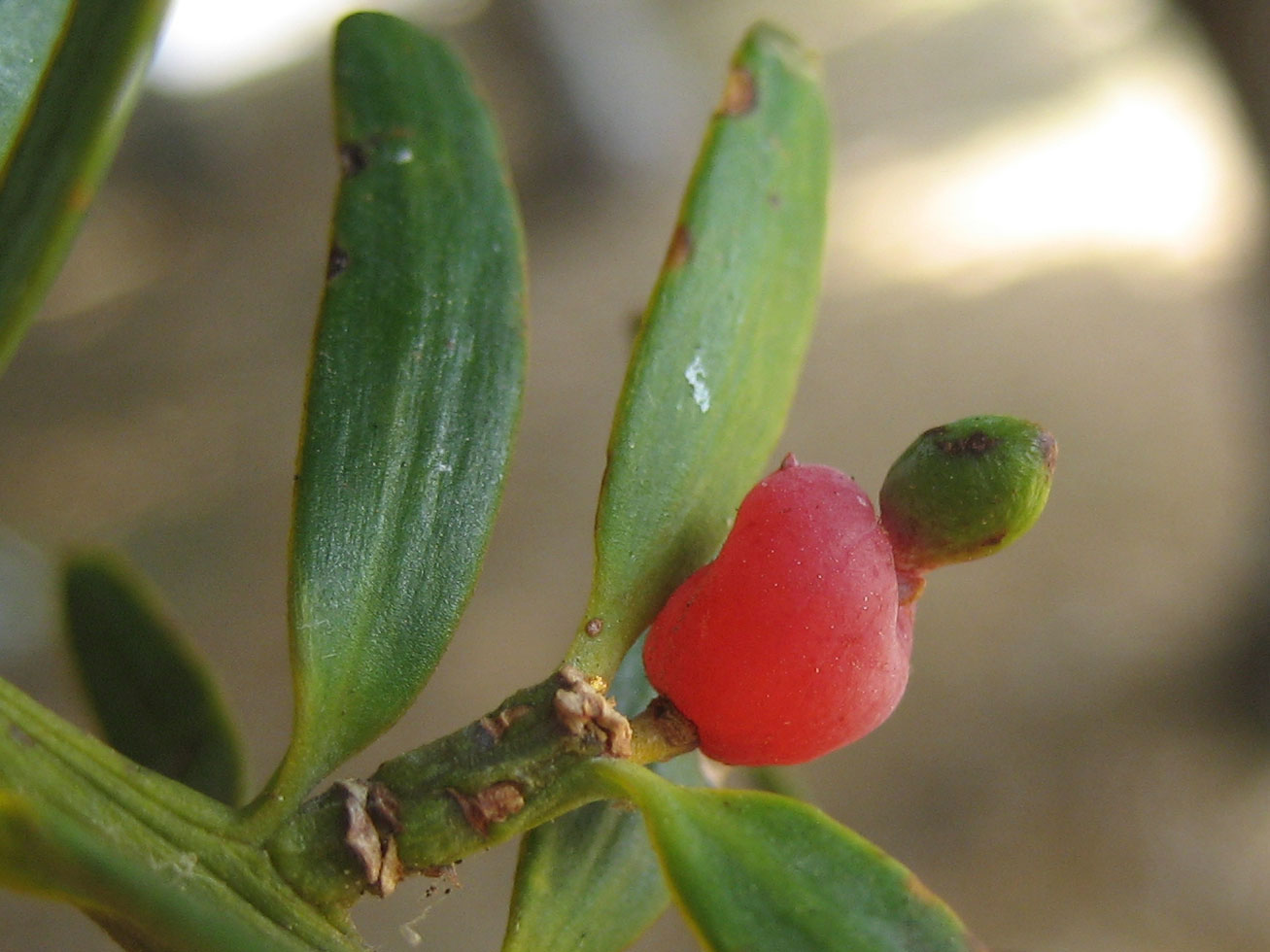
A seed cone of P. totara showing a red receptacle and a green epimatium

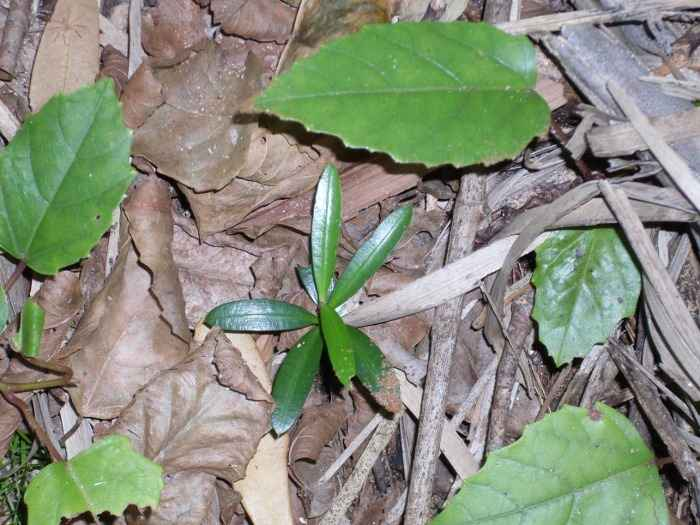
A seedling of P. elatus

== Distribution ==
The natural distribution of the genus consists of much of Africa, Asia, Australia, Central and South America, and several South Pacific islands. The genus occurs from southern Chile north to Mexico in the Americas and from New Zealand north to Japan in the Asia-Pacific region. As recently as the Late Pliocene, Podocarpus had a range in the Northern United States.

Podocarpus and the Podocarpaceae were endemic to the ancient supercontinent of Gondwana, which broke up into Africa, South America, India, Australia-New Guinea, New Zealand, and New Caledonia between 105 and 45 million years ago. Podocarpus is a characteristic tree of the Antarctic flora, which originated in the cool, moist climate of southern Gondwana, and elements of the flora survive in the humid temperate regions of the former supercontinent. As the continents drifted north and became drier and hotter, podocarps and other members of the Antarctic flora generally retreated to humid regions, especially in Australia, where sclerophyll genera such as Acacia and Eucalyptus became predominant. The flora of Malesia, which includes the Malay peninsula, Indonesia, the Philippines, and New Guinea, is generally derived from Asia, but includes many elements of the old Gondwana flora, including several other genera in the Podocarpaceae (Dacrycarpus, Dacrydium, Falcatifolium, Nageia, Phyllocladus, and the Malesian endemic Sundacarpus), and also Agathis in the Araucariaceae.

== Classification ==
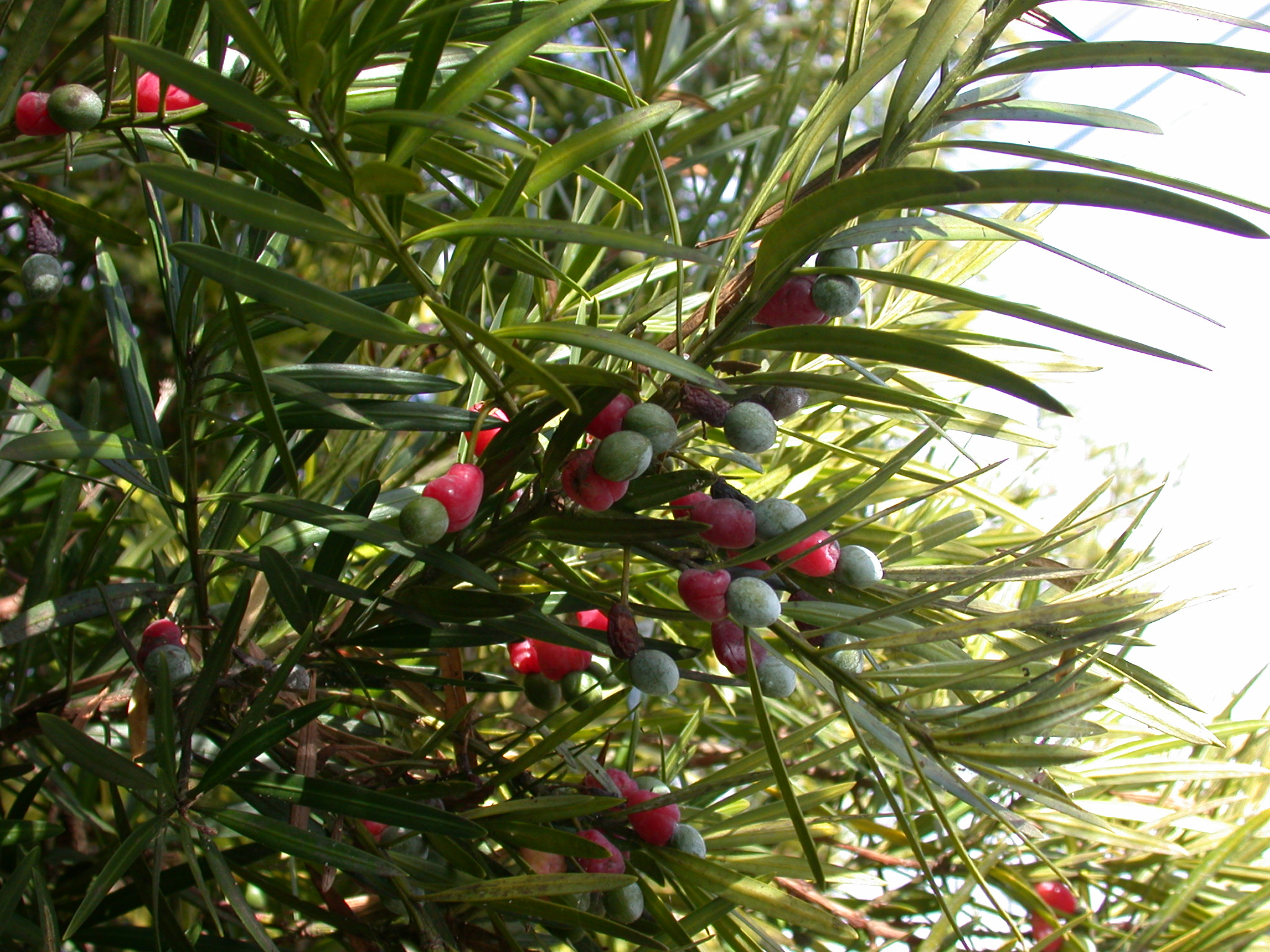
Podocarpus macrophyllus with mature seed cones

The two subgenera, Podocarpus and Foliolatus, are distinguished by cone and seed morphology.

In Podocarpus, the cone is not subtended by lanceolate bracts, and the seed usually has an apical ridge. Species are distributed in the temperate forests of Tasmania, New Zealand, and southern Chile, with a few occurring in the tropical highlands of Africa and the Americas.

In Foliolatus, the cone is subtended by two lanceolate bracts ("foliola"), and the seed usually lacks an apical ridge. The species are tropical and subtropical, concentrated in eastern and southeastern Asia and Malesia, overlapping with subgenus Podocarpus in northeastern Australia and New Caledonia.

Species in family Podocarpaceae have been reshuffled a number of times based on genetic and physiological evidence, with many species formerly assigned to Podocarpus now assigned to other genera. A sequence of classification schemes has moved species between Nageia and Podocarpus, and in 1969, de Laubenfels divided the huge genus Podocarpus into Dacrycarpus, Decussocarpus (an invalid name he later revised to the valid Nageia), Prumnopitys, and Podocarpus. Some species of genus Afrocarpus were formerly in Podocarpus, such as Afrocarpus gracilior.

Phylogeny of Podocarpus

- - (Podocarpus)
    - - - P. atjehensis (Wasscher) de Laubenfels
        - P. nubigenus Lindley
    - - - section Australis
          - - P. nivalis Hooker
            - - P. acutifolius Kirk
              - P. totara Benn. ex Don
          - - P. lawrencei Hooker
            - - P. laetus Hooibr. ex Endlicher
              - - P. gnidioides Carrière
                - P. hallii Kirk
      - - - section Capitulatis
            - P. parlatorei Pilger
            - - - P. glomeratus Don
                - P. transiens (Pilger) de Laubenfels
              - - P. lambertii Klotzsch ex Endlicher
                - P. sprucei Parlatore
          - section Podocarpus
            - - P. elongatus (Aiton) L'Héritier de Brutelle ex Persoon
              - - P. latifolius (Thunberg) Brown ex de Mirbel
                - P. milanjianus Rendle
            - - P. henkelii Stapf ex Dallim. & Jackson
              - - P. capuronii de Laubenfels
                - P. madagascariensis Baker
        - - section Crassiformis
            - P. smithii de Laubenfels
            - P. salignus Don
          - section Nemoralis
            - P. matudae Lundell
            - - - P. urbanii Pilger
                - - P. purdieanus Hooker
                  - - P. aristulatus Parlatore
                    - - P. ekmanii Urb.
                      - - P. barretoi de Laubenfels & Silba
                        - - P. angustifolius Grisebach
                          - P. rusbyi Buchholz & Gray
              - - P. hispaniolensis de Laubenfels
                - - - P. celatus de Laubenfels
                    - P. oleifolius Don
                  - - P. sellowii Klotzsch ex Endlicher
                    - - P. costaricensis de Laubenfels
                      - - - P. brasiliensis de Laubenfels
                          - P. guatemalensis Standley
                        - - P. coriaceus Richard & Richard
                          - - P. magnifolius Buchholz & Gray
                            - P. trinitensis Buchholz & Gray
  - (Foliolatus)
    - - section Spinulosus
        - P. drouynianus von Mueller
        - - P. spinulosus (Smith) Br. ex de Mirbel
          - - P. glaucus Foxworthy
            - P. rostratus Laurent
    - - P. decumbens Gray
      - - section Longifoliolati
          - - P. longifoliolatus Pilger
            - P. novae-caledoniae Vieillard ex Brongniart & Gris
          - - - P. rumphii Blume
              - - P. grayae de Laubenfels
                - - P. elatus Br. ex Endlicher
                  - P. polystachyus Br. ex Endlicher
            - - P. beecherae de Laubenfels
              - - P. sylvestris Buchholz
                - - P. lucienii de Laubenfels
                  - P. polyspermus de Laubenfels
        - section Foliolati
          - P. brassii Pilger
          - - P. dispermus White
            - - - P. ramosii Mill
                - P. rubens de Laubenfels
              - - P. archboldii Gray
                - - P. crassigemmis de Laubenfels
                  - - P. salomoniensis Wasscher
                    - - P. brevifolius (Stapf) Foxworthy
                      - - P. ledermannii Pilger
                        - - - P. pallidus Gray
                            - - P. decipiens Gray
                              - P. degeneri (Gray) de Laubenfels
                          - - - P. affinis Seemann
                              - - P. insularis de Laubenfels
                                - - P. annamiensis Gray
                                  - - P. bracteatus Blume
                                    - P. pseudobracteatus de Laubenfels
                            - - - P. spathoides de Laubenfels
                                - P. teysmannii Miquel
                              - - P. gibbsiae N.E.Gray
                                - - - P. subtropicalis de Laubenfels
                                    - - P. deflexus Ridley
                                      - - P. costalis Presl
                                        - P. philippinensis Foxw.
                                  - - - P. salicifolius Klotzsch & Karsten ex Endlicher
                                      - - P. chingianus Hu
                                        - P. pilgeri Foxworthy
                                    - - P. neriifolius Don
                                      - - P. lophatus de Laubenfels
                                        - - P. nakaii Hayata
                                          - - P. laubenfelsii Tiong
                                            - - P. forrestii Craib & Smith
                                              - - P. fasciculus de Laubenfels
                                                - P. macrophyllus (Thunberg) Sweet

=== Species ===
In 1985 David J. de Laubenfels divided the genus into two subgenera, Podocarpus and Foliolatus, and further divided each subgenus into nine sections. Robert Reid Mill wrote (2015) that while the two subgenera have been strongly supported by subsequent evidence, the sections are "mostly are poorly supported by molecular evidence". In 2015 de Laubenfels revised the sections of subgenus Foliolatus.

- Subgenus Podocarpus
  - section Podocarpus (eastern and southern Africa)
    - Podocarpus elongatus (Aiton) L'Hér. ex Pers.
    - Podocarpus latifolius (Thunb.) R.Br. ex Mirb.
    - Podocarpus milanjianus Rendle
  - section Scytopodium (Madagascar, eastern Africa)
    - Podocarpus capuronii de Laub.
    - Podocarpus henkelii Stapf ex Dallim. & A.B.Jacks
    - Podocarpus humbertii de Laub.
    - Podocarpus madagascariensis Baker
    - Podocarpus perrieri Gaussen & Woltz
    - Podocarpus rostratus J.Laurent
  - section Australis (southeast Australia, New Zealand, New Caledonia, southern Chile)
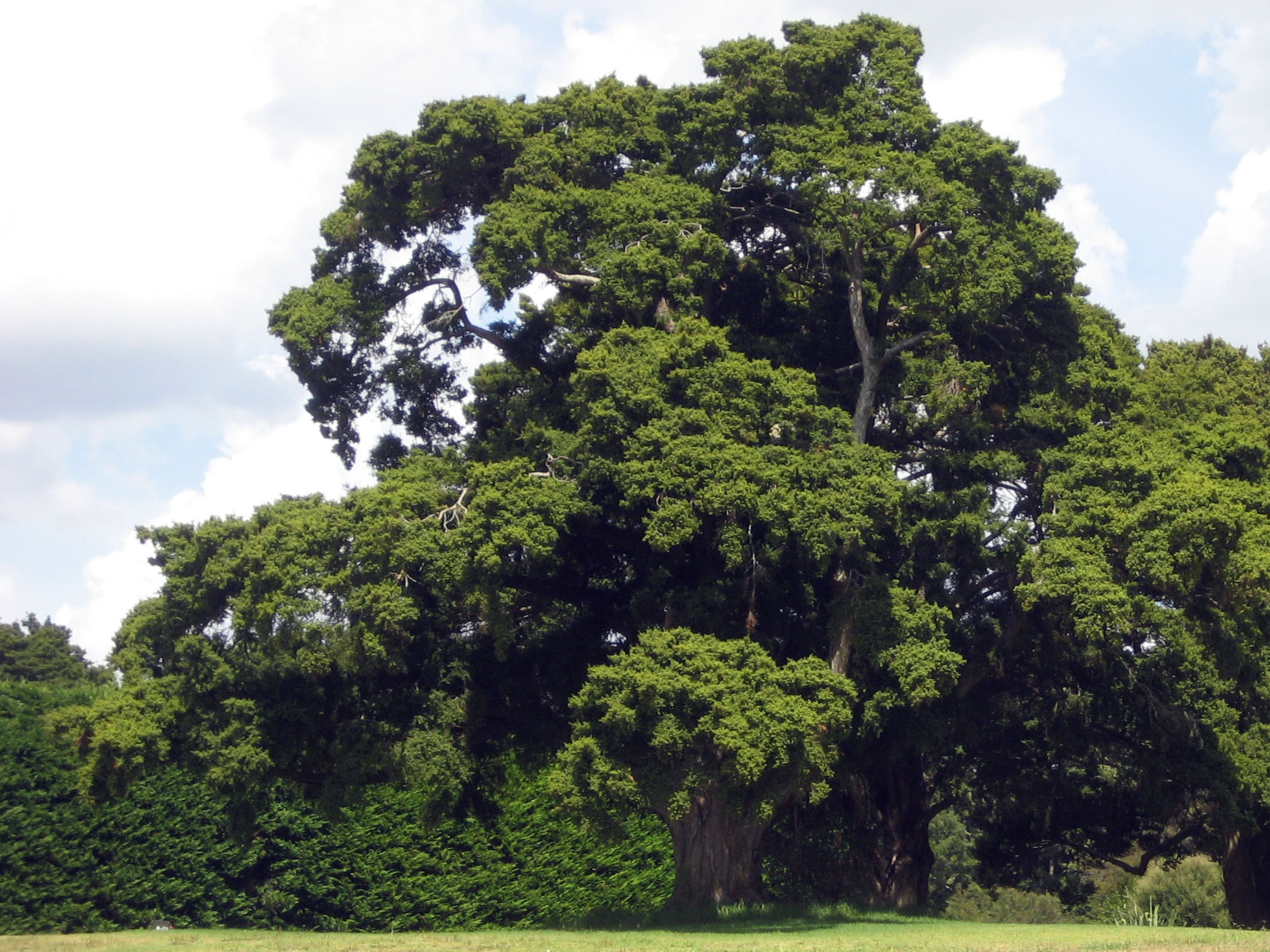
    P. totara
    - Podocarpus acutifolius Kirk
    - Podocarpus gnidioides Carrière
    - Podocarpus laetus Hooibr. ex Endl.
    - Podocarpus lawrencii Hook.f. (synonym Podocarpus alpinus R.Br. ex Hook.f.)
    - Podocarpus × loderi Cockayne (P. laetus × P. totara)
    - Podocarpus nivalis Hook.
    - Podocarpus nubigenus Lindl.
    - Podocarpus totara G.Benn. ex D.Don
  - section Crassiformis (northeast Queensland)
    - Podocarpus smithii de Laub.
  - section Capitulatis (central Chile, southern Brazil, the Andes from northern Argentina to Ecuador)
    - Podocarpus aracensis de Laub. & Silba
    - Podocarpus glomeratus D.Don
    - Podocarpus lambertii Klotzsch ex Endl.
    - Podocarpus parlatorei Pilg.
    - Podocarpus salignus D.Don
    - Podocarpus sellowii Klotzsch ex Endl.
    - Podocarpus sprucei Parl.
    - Podocarpus transiens (Pilg.) de Laub.
  - section Pratensis (southeast Mexico to Guyana and Peru)
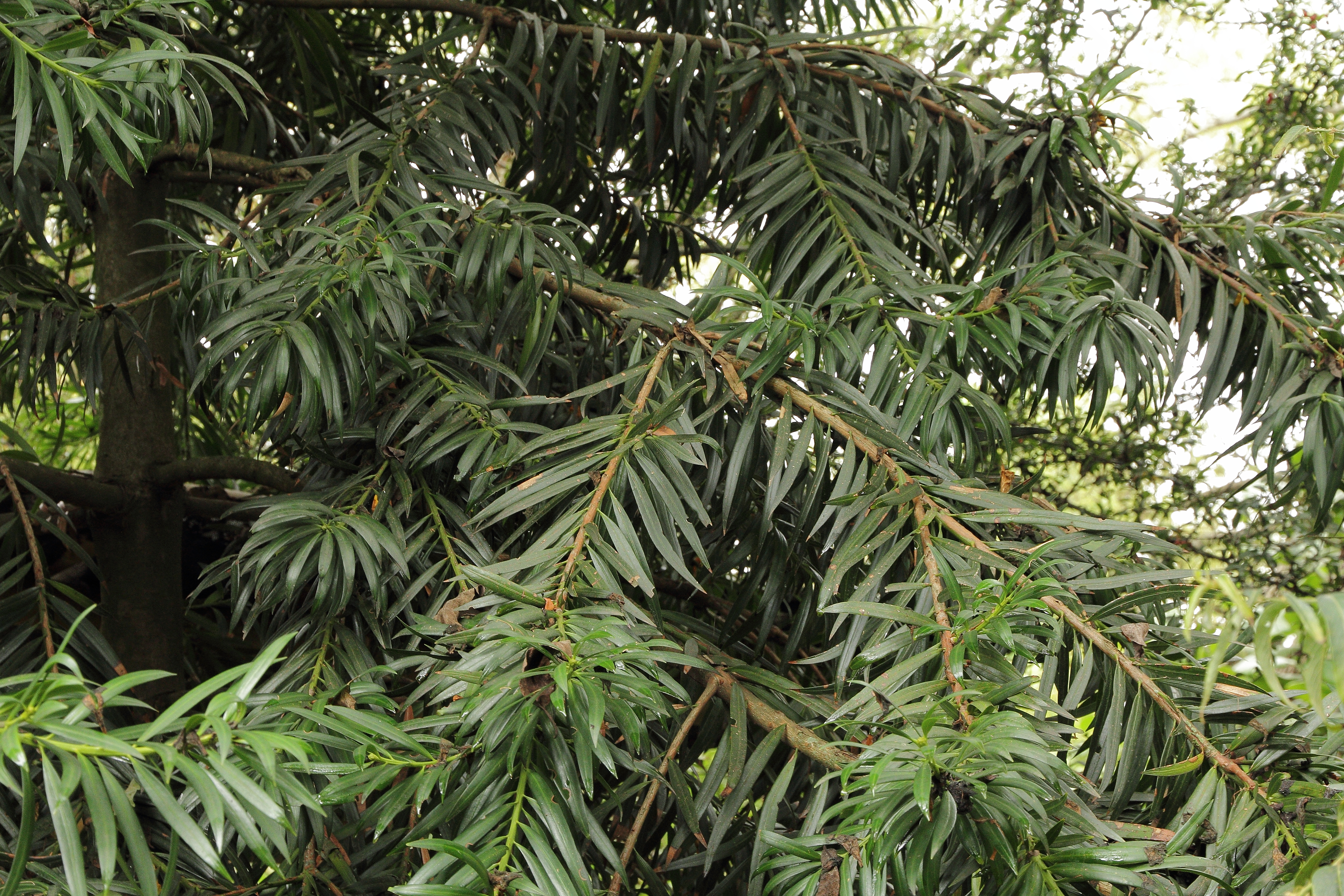
    P. oleifolius
    - Podocarpus oleifolius D.Don
    - Podocarpus pendulifolius J.Buchholz & N.E.Gray
    - Podocarpus tepuiensis J.Buchholz & N.E.Gray
  - section Lanceolatis (southern Mexico, Puerto Rico, Lesser Antilles, Venezuela to highland Bolivia)
    - Podocarpus coriaceus Rich.
    - Podocarpus matudae Lundell
    - Podocarpus rusbyi J.Buchholz & N.E.Gray
    - Podocarpus salicifolius Klotzsch & H.Karst. ex Endl.
    - Podocarpus steyermarkii J.Buchholz & N.E.Gray
  - section Pumilis (southern Caribbean islands and Guiana Highlands)
    - Podocarpus angustifolius Griseb.
    - Podocarpus aristulatus Parl.
    - Podocarpus buchii Urb.
    - Podocarpus ekmanii Urb.
    - Podocarpus hispaniolensis de Laub.
    - Podocarpus roraimae Pilg. (synonym Podocarpus buchholzii de Laub.)
    - Podocarpus urbanii Pilg.
    - Podocarpus victorinianus Carabia
  - section Nemoralis (central and northern South America, south to Bolivia)
    - Podocarpus acuminatus de Laub.
    - Podocarpus brasiliensis de Laub.
    - Podocarpus celatus de Laub.
    - Podocarpus costaricensis de Laub.
    - Podocarpus guatemalensis Standl.
    - Podocarpus magnifolius J.Buchholz & N.E.Gray
    - Podocarpus purdieanus Hook.
    - Podocarpus trinitensis J.Buchholz & N.E.Gray
- Subgenus Foliolatus
  - section Acuminatus (Sikkim, India to Borneo, New Guinea, New Britain, and northern Queensland)
    - Podocarpus dispermus C.T.White
    - Podocarpus hookeri de Laub.
    - Podocarpus ledermannii Pilg. (section type)
    - Podocarpus marginalis de Laub.
    - Podocarpus micropedunculatus de Laub.
  - section Bracteatus (Sumatra to Fiji)
    - Podocarpus atjehensis (Wasscher) de Laub.
    - Podocarpus bracteatus Blume
    - Podocarpus confertus de Laub.
    - Podocarpus degeneri (N.E.Gray) de Laub.
    - Podocarpus pseudobracteatus de Laub.
  - section Foliolatus (Nepal to Sumatra, the Philippines, and New Guinea to Tonga)
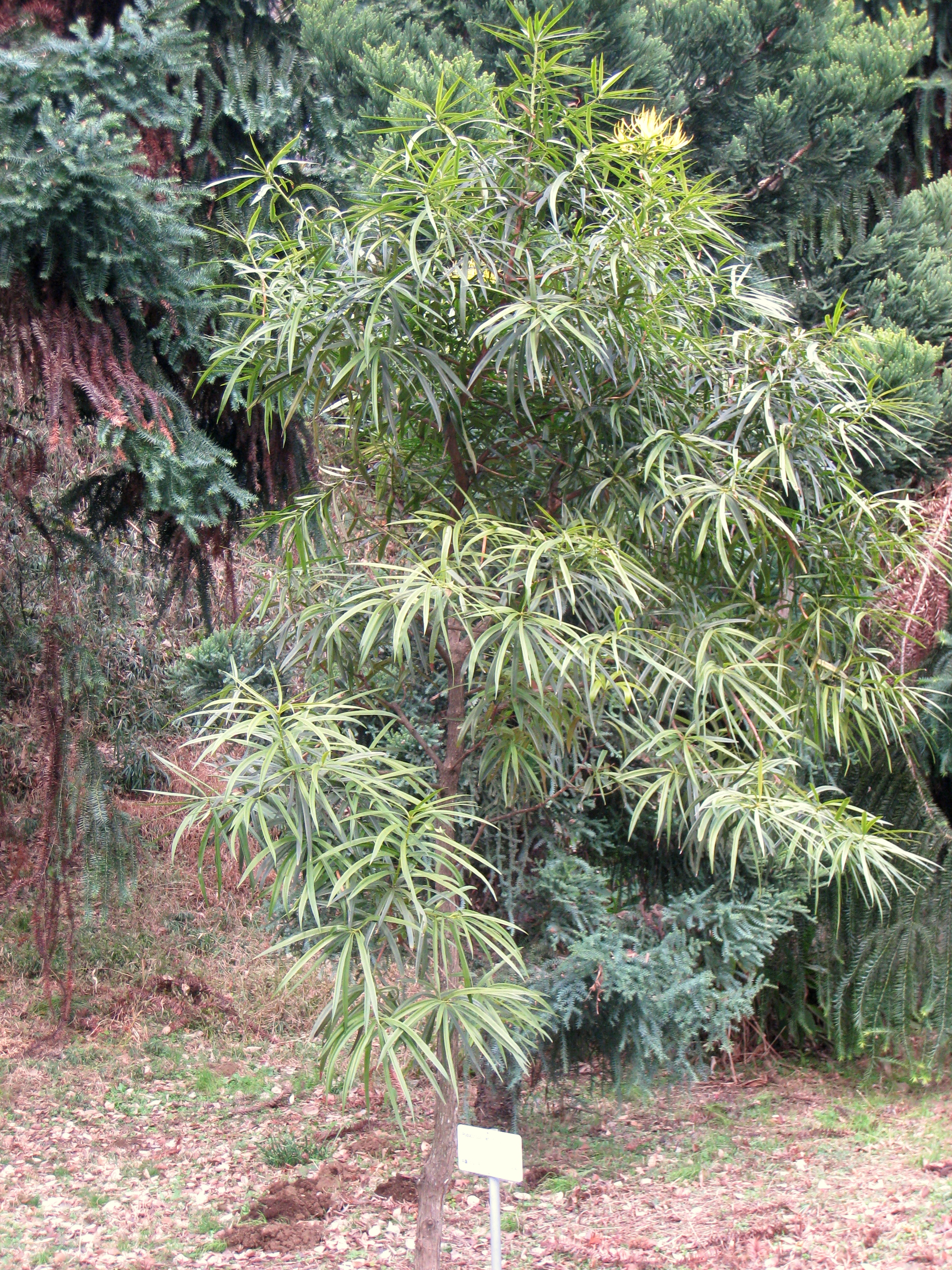
    P. neriifolius
    - Podocarpus idenburgensis N.E.Gray
    - Podocarpus insularis de Laub.
    - Podocarpus neolinearis Idrees & Z.Yong Zhang (syn. Podocarpus linearis de Laub.)
    - Podocarpus neglectus de Laub.
    - Podocarpus neriifolius D.Don (section type)
    - Podocarpus pallidus N.E.Gray
    - Podocarpus rubens de Laub. (synonym Podocarpus indonesiensis de Laub. & Silba)
    - Podocarpus vanuatuensis de Laub.
  - section Globulus (Taiwan to Vietnam, Sumatra and Borneo, and New Caledonia)
    - Podocarpus annamiensis N.E.Gray
    - Podocarpus beecherae de Laub. (section type)
    - Podocarpus globulus de Laub.
    - Podocarpus lucienii de Laub.
    - Podocarpus nakaii Hayata
    - Podocarpus oblongus de Laub.
    - Podocarpus sylvestris J.Buchholz (syn. Podocarpus colliculatus (N.E.Gray) de Laub.)
    - Podocarpus teysmannii Miq. (syn. Podocarpus epiphyticus de Laub. & Silba)
  - section Longifoliolatus (Peninsular Malaysia and Sumatra east to Fiji)
    - Podocarpus decipiens N.E.Gray
    - Podocarpus decumbens N.E.Gray
    - Podocarpus deflexus Ridl.
    - Podocarpus levis de Laub.
    - Podocarpus longifoliolatus Pilg. (section type)
    - Podocarpus novoguineensis de Laub.
    - Podocarpus polyspermus de Laub.
    - Podocarpus salomoniensis Wasscher
  - section Gracilis (southern China, across Malesia to Fiji)
    - Podocarpus affinis Seem.
    - Podocarpus glaucus Foxw.
    - Podocarpus pilgeri Foxw.
    - Podocarpus ramosii R.R.Mill
  - section Macrostachyus (Eastern India to New Guinea)
    - Podocarpus archboldii N.E.Gray (syn. Podocarpus crassigemmis de Laub.) (section type)
    - Podocarpus brassii Pilg.
    - Podocarpus brevifolius (Stapf) Foxw.
    - Podocarpus lenticularis de Laub.
    - Podocarpus palawanensis de Laub. & Silba
  - section Rumphius (Hainan, south through Malesia to northern Queensland)
    - Podocarpus grayae de Laub. (a.k.a. P. grayii and P. grayi)
    - Podocarpus laubenfelsii Tiong
    - Podocarpus rumphii Blume
  - section Polystachyus (southern China and Japan, through Malaya to New Guinea and northeast Australia)
    - Podocarpus chingianus S.Y.Hu
    - Podocarpus elatus R.Br. ex Endl.
    - Podocarpus fasciculus de Laub.
    - Podocarpus macrocarpus de Laub.
    - Podocarpus macrophyllus (Thunb.) Sweet
      - Podocarpus macrophyllus var. macrophyllus (Thunb.) Sweet
      - Podocarpus macrophyllus var. maki Siebold & Zucc. (syn. Podocarpus chinensis Wall. ex Benn.)
    - Podocarpus polystachyus R.Br. ex Endl.
    - Podocarpus ridleyi (Wasscher) N.E.Gray
    - Podocarpus subtropicalis de Laub.
  - section Spathoides (southern China to New Caledonia)
    - Podocarpus borneensis de Laub.
    - Podocarpus costalis C.Presl
    - Podocarpus forrestii Craib & W.W.Sm.
    - Podocarpus gibbsiae N.E.Gray
    - Podocarpus laminaris de Laub.
    - Podocarpus lophatus de Laub.
    - Podocarpus novae-caledoniae Vieill. ex Brongn. & Gris
    - Podocarpus orarius R.R.Mill & M.Whiting
    - Podocarpus spathoides de Laub.
    - Podocarpus thevetiifolius Zipp. ex Blume
    - Podocarpus tixieri Gaussen ex Silba
  - section Spinulosus (southeast and southwest coasts of Australia)
    - Podocarpus drouynianus F.Muell.
    - Podocarpus spinulosus (Sm.) R.Br. ex Mirb.

== Allergenic potential ==
Male Podocarpus spp. are extremely allergenic, and have an OPALS allergy-scale rating of 10 out of 10. Conversely, completely female Podocarpus plants have an OPALS rating of 1, and are considered "allergy-fighting", as they capture pollen while producing none.

Podocarpus resemble yews, and as with yews, the stems, leaves, flowers, and pollen of Podocarpus are all poisonous. Additionally, the leaves, stems, bark, and pollen are cytotoxic. The male Podocarpus blooms and releases this cytotoxic pollen in the spring and early summer.

== Uses ==
The earliest use of P. elongatus dates back to the southern African Middle Stone Age where it was used to produce an adhesive by distillation. Today, several species of Podocarpus are grown as garden trees, or trained into hedges, espaliers, or screens. In the novel Jurassic Park by Michael Crichton, Podocarpus trees (misspelled as "protocarpus") were used on Isla Nublar, Costa Rica, to conceal electric fences from visitors. Common garden species used for their attractive deep-green foliage and neat habits include P. macrophyllus, known commonly as Buddhist pine, fern pine, or kusamaki, P. salignus from Chile, and P. nivalis, a smaller, red-fleshy-coned shrub. Some members of the genera Nageia, Prumnopitys, and Afrocarpus are marketed under the genus name Podocarpus.

The red, purple, or bluish fleshy cone (popularly called a "fruit") of most species of Podocarpus are edible, raw or cooked into jams or pies. They have a mucilaginous texture with a slightly sweet flavor. They are slightly toxic, so should be eaten only in small amounts, especially when raw.

Some species of Podocarpus are used in systems of traditional medicine for conditions such as fevers, coughs, arthritis, sexually transmitted diseases, and canine distemper.
