= Podocarpus affinis =

Conservation status
- Near Threatened (IUCN 3.1)

Scientific classification
- Kingdom: Plantae
- Clade: Tracheophytes
- Clade: Gymnosperms
- Division: Pinophyta
- Class: Pinopsida
- Order: Araucariales
- Family: Podocarpaceae
- Genus: Podocarpus
- Species: P. affinis

Binomial name
- Podocarpus affinis Seem.

Species of conifer

Podocarpus affinis is a species of conifer in the family Podocarpaceae. It is a tree endemic to Fiji, where it is known only from high mountain ridges on the island of Viti Levu.
