= Podocarpus brassii =

Conservation status
- Least Concern (IUCN 3.1)

Scientific classification
- Kingdom: Plantae
- Clade: Tracheophytes
- Clade: Gymnosperms
- Division: Pinophyta
- Class: Pinopsida
- Order: Araucariales
- Family: Podocarpaceae
- Genus: Podocarpus
- Species: P. brassii

Binomial name
- Podocarpus brassii Pilg. (1937)

Varieties
- Podocarpus brassii var. brassii; Podocarpus brassii var. humilis de Laub.

Species of conifer

Podocarpus brassii is a species of conifer in the family Podocarpaceae. It is endemic to the island of New Guinea, which is divided between Indonesia and Papua New Guinea.

Podocarpus brassii is a montane species, growing in upper montane evergreen rainforest, subalpine mossy forest, and subalpine and alpine scrubland, and sometimes in or at the edges of boggy alpine grassland, from 2,500 to 4,000 metres elevation.

Two varieties are accepted. Podocarpus brassii var. brassii is the more common tree form, It often grows as an emergent tree above shrubs between 3,100 and 4,000 meters elevation, around or above the tree line, and less often in dense forest as low as 2,700 m where it is a straight-boled tree 25 to 30 metres tall. Podocarpus brassii var. humilis de Laub. is a shrub or small tree. In wet areas it can form dense shrubby mats only 15-30 cm tall and covering up to three square metres.
