= Podocarpus rostratus =

Conservation status
- Endangered (IUCN 3.1)

Scientific classification
- Kingdom: Plantae
- Clade: Tracheophytes
- Clade: Gymnospermae
- Division: Pinophyta
- Class: Pinopsida
- Order: Araucariales
- Family: Podocarpaceae
- Genus: Podocarpus
- Species: P. rostratus

Binomial name
- Podocarpus rostratus Laurent

Species of conifer

Podocarpus rostratus is a species of conifer in the family Podocarpaceae. It is endemic to Madagascar.

== Range and habitat ==
Podocarpus rostratus is native to the high-elevation ericoid thickets in Madagascar's highlands, between 1,800 and 2,400 meters elevation. It has been recorded in found in Antsiranana, Fianarantsoa, Mahajanga, and Toamasina provinces, including the Tsaratanana Massif.

P. rostratus is intolerant of fires, which are frequent in the ericoid thickets ecoregion. It is typically found in less fire-prone habitats, including open rocky slopes composed of silicaceous rocks, and wetter sites along streams.
