= Podocarpus salicifolius =

Conservation status
- Least Concern (IUCN 3.1)

Scientific classification
- Kingdom: Plantae
- Clade: Tracheophytes
- Clade: Gymnosperms
- Division: Pinophyta
- Class: Pinopsida
- Order: Araucariales
- Family: Podocarpaceae
- Genus: Podocarpus
- Species: P. salicifolius

Binomial name
- Podocarpus salicifolius Klotzsch & H.Karst. ex Endl.

Synonyms
- Nageia salicifolia (Klotzsch & H.Karst. ex Endl.) Kuntze; Podocarpus pittieri J.Buchholz & N.E.Gray

Species of conifer

Podocarpus salicifolius is a species of conifer in the family Podocarpaceae. It is a tree native to Bolivia, Colombia, northern Brazil, Peru, and Venezuela.
