= Podocarpus ledermannii =

Conservation status
- Least Concern (IUCN 3.1)

Scientific classification
- Kingdom: Plantae
- Clade: Tracheophytes
- Clade: Gymnosperms
- Division: Pinophyta
- Class: Pinopsida
- Order: Araucariales
- Family: Podocarpaceae
- Genus: Podocarpus
- Species: P. ledermannii

Binomial name
- Podocarpus ledermannii Pilg.

Varieties
- Podocarpus ledermannii var. expansus de Laub.; Podocarpus ledermannii var. ledermannii

Species of conifer

Podocarpus ledermannii is a species of conifer in the family Podocarpaceae. It is native to the island of New Guinea in Indonesia and Papua New Guinea, and the island of New Britain in the Bismarck Archipelago of Papua New Guinea.

Podocarpus ledermannii is found in lowland and montane rain forests, from near sea level up to 2,300 meters elevation. It has been found in the Purari and Sepik river delta forests, and in lower montane forests dominated by species of Castanopsis. It typically grows as a scattered tree, but can be locally dominant. It is an understorey tree in high-canopied forests, and can be a canopy tree in lower-canopied forests.
