= Podocarpus annamiensis =

Conservation status
- Data Deficient (IUCN 3.1)

Scientific classification
- Kingdom: Plantae
- Clade: Tracheophytes
- Clade: Gymnosperms
- Division: Pinophyta
- Class: Pinopsida
- Order: Araucariales
- Family: Podocarpaceae
- Genus: Podocarpus
- Species: P. annamiensis

Binomial name
- Podocarpus annamiensis N.E.Gray

Species of conifer

Podocarpus annamiensis is a species of conifer in the family Podocarpaceae. It is native to Myanmar, Vietnam and Hainan Island, China. It is threatened by habitat loss.

Podocarpus annamiensis has recently been considered a synonym of P. neriifolius.
