= Podocarpus brevifolius =

Conservation status
- Near Threatened (IUCN 3.1)

Scientific classification
- Kingdom: Plantae
- Clade: Tracheophytes
- Clade: Gymnosperms
- Division: Pinophyta
- Class: Pinopsida
- Order: Araucariales
- Family: Podocarpaceae
- Genus: Podocarpus
- Species: P. brevifolius

Binomial name
- Podocarpus brevifolius (Stapf) Foxw.

Species of conifer

Podocarpus brevifolius is a species of conifer in the family Podocarpaceae. It is endemic to Mount Kinabalu and surrounding ridges in Sabah, Malaysia.
