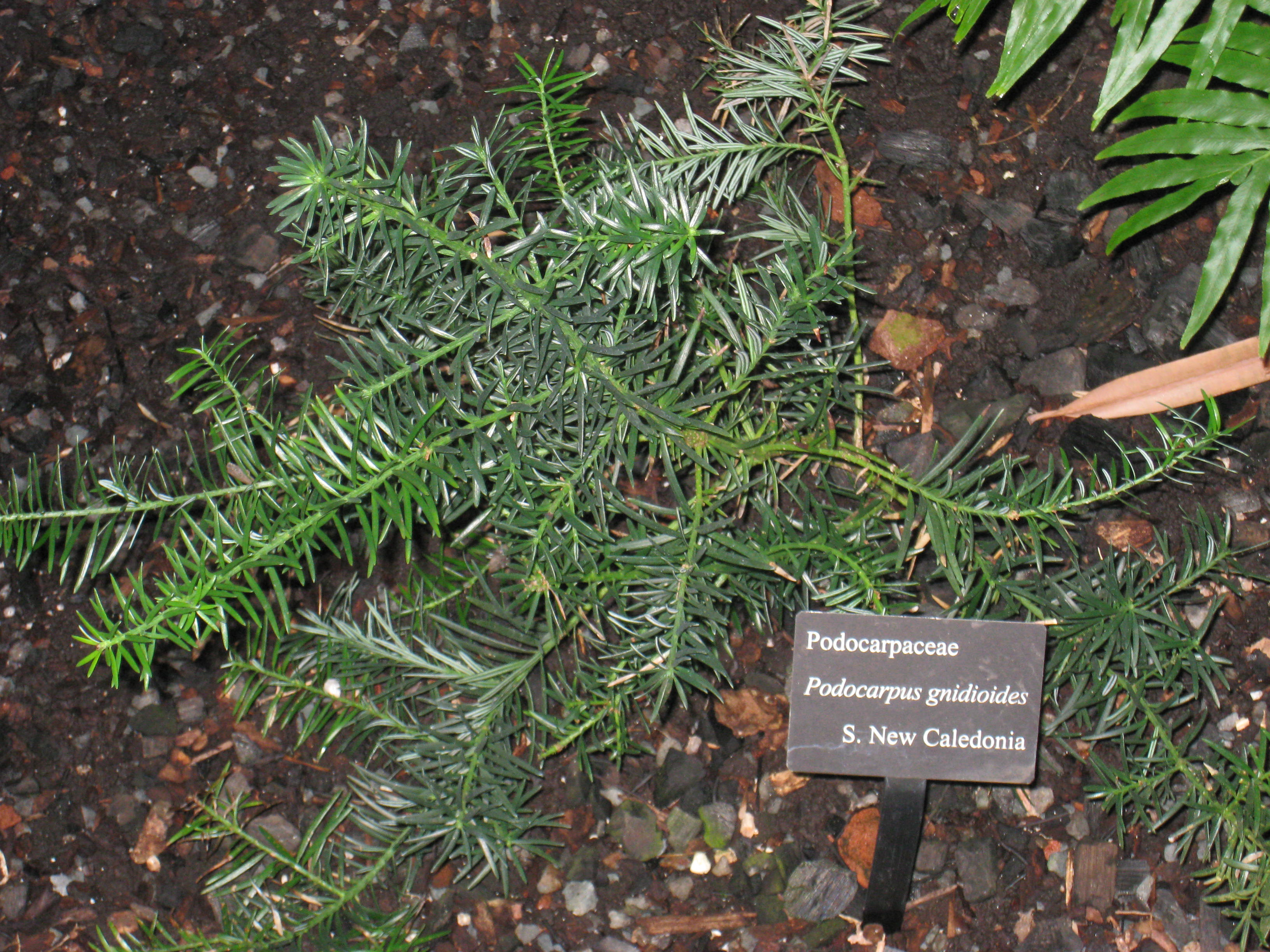

Conservation status
- Near Threatened (IUCN 3.1)

Scientific classification
- Kingdom: Plantae
- Clade: Tracheophytes
- Clade: Gymnosperms
- Division: Pinophyta
- Class: Pinopsida
- Order: Araucariales
- Family: Podocarpaceae
- Genus: Podocarpus
- Species: P. gnidioides

Binomial name
- Podocarpus gnidioides Carrière

Synonyms
- Nageia gnidioides (Carrière) Kuntze; Podocarpus alpinus var. arborescens Brongn. & Gris; Podocarpus alpinus var. caespitosus Pancher ex Brongn. & Gris; Podocarpus caespitosus (Pancher ex Brongn. & Gris) Baum.-Bod.; Podocarpus gnidioides subsp. caespitosus (Pancher ex Brongn. & Gris) Silba; Podocarpus gnidioides var. caespitosus (Pancher ex Brongn. & Gris) Carrière

= Podocarpus gnidioides =

Species of conifer

Podocarpus gnidioides is a species of conifer in the family Podocarpaceae. It is a shrub endemic to southeastern New Caledonia.
