= Podocarpus perrieri =

Conservation status
- Critically endangered, possibly extinct (IUCN 3.1)

Scientific classification
- Kingdom: Plantae
- Clade: Tracheophytes
- Clade: Gymnospermae
- Division: Pinophyta
- Class: Pinopsida
- Order: Araucariales
- Family: Podocarpaceae
- Genus: Podocarpus
- Species: P. perrieri

Binomial name
- Podocarpus perrieri Gaussen & Woltz

Species of conifer

Podocarpus perrieri is a species of conifer in the family Podocarpaceae. It is found only in Madagascar.
