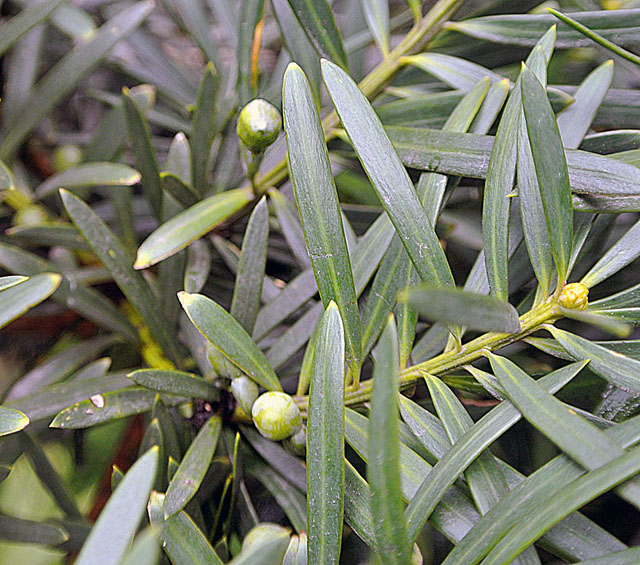

Conservation status
- Endangered (IUCN 3.1)

Scientific classification
- Kingdom: Plantae
- Clade: Tracheophytes
- Clade: Gymnosperms
- Division: Pinophyta
- Class: Pinopsida
- Order: Araucariales
- Family: Podocarpaceae
- Genus: Podocarpus
- Species: P. sprucei

Binomial name
- Podocarpus sprucei Parl.

Synonyms
- Nageia sprucei (Parl.) Kuntze

= Podocarpus sprucei =

Species of conifer

Podocarpus sprucei is a species of conifer in the family Podocarpaceae. It is a tree native to western Ecuador and northern Peru.

== Description ==
They are trees growing to 20 m high (smaller at the highest elevations), with reddish brown scaly bark. Leaves elliptic to linear, dark green, stiff, 2–7 cm long, apex acute, midrib on upper side a continuous shallow groove. Male cones in groups of 3–10 on 1.5-2.5 cm long peduncles, each cone up to 1 cm long. Seed cones axillary, solitary, purple-red when ripe; seed globose, 5–8 mm long.

== Distribution and habitat ==
Podocarpus sprucei can be found in cloud forests at 1800–3900 m of elevation in Ecuador and northern Peru.
