= Podocarpus tepuiensis =

Conservation status
- Least Concern (IUCN 3.1)

Scientific classification
- Kingdom: Plantae
- Clade: Tracheophytes
- Clade: Gymnospermae
- Division: Pinophyta
- Class: Pinopsida
- Order: Araucariales
- Family: Podocarpaceae
- Genus: Podocarpus
- Species: P. tepuiensis

Binomial name
- Podocarpus tepuiensis J.Buchholz & N.E.Gray

Species of conifer

Podocarpus tepuiensis is a species of conifer in the family Podocarpaceae. It is a tree native to southern Venezuela and southeastern Ecuador.
