= Podocarpus chingianus =

Conservation status
- Data Deficient (IUCN 3.1)

Scientific classification
- Kingdom: Plantae
- Clade: Tracheophytes
- Clade: Gymnosperms
- Division: Pinophyta
- Class: Pinopsida
- Order: Araucariales
- Family: Podocarpaceae
- Genus: Podocarpus
- Species: P. chingianus

Binomial name
- Podocarpus chingianus S.Y.Hu

Synonyms
- Margbensonia chingiana (S.Y.Hu) A.V.Bobrov & Melikyan; Podocarpus macrophyllus var. chingii N.E.Gray

Species of conifer

Podocarpus chingianus, commonly known as Zhu guan luo han song, is a species of conifer in the family Podocarpaceae. It is a tree native to Jiangsu and Zhejiang provinces of southeastern China. It is known from two or three locations, where it grows in forest and open thickets from sea level to 1,000 metres elevation.
