= Podocarpus victorinianus =

Scientific classification
- Kingdom: Plantae
- Clade: Tracheophytes
- Clade: Gymnosperms
- Division: Pinophyta
- Class: Pinopsida
- Order: Araucariales
- Family: Podocarpaceae
- Genus: Podocarpus
- Species: P. victorinianus

Binomial name
- Podocarpus victorinianus Carabia

Synonyms
- Podocarpus leonii Carabia

Species of conifer

Podocarpus victorinianus is a species of conifer in the family Podocarpaceae. It is a tree endemic to eastern Cuba.
