= Podocarpus ramosii =

Conservation status
- Data Deficient (IUCN 2.3)

Scientific classification
- Kingdom: Plantae
- Clade: Tracheophytes
- Clade: Gymnospermae
- Division: Pinophyta
- Class: Pinopsida
- Order: Araucariales
- Family: Podocarpaceae
- Genus: Podocarpus
- Species: P. ramosii

Binomial name
- Podocarpus ramosii R.R.Mill (2006)

Synonyms
- Podocarpus rotundus de Laub. (1978), non Bocharn. (1960), fossil name.

Species of conifer

Podocarpus ramosii is a species of conifer in the family Podocarpaceae. It a small tree found in two separated locations, Mount Banahao on the island of Luzon in the Philippines and Mount Beratus on eastern Borneo in Indonesia. It grows in dwarf mossy forests close to the summits, at 1,000 metres on Mount Beratus and 2,170 metres on Mount Banahao.
