= Podocarpus steyermarkii =

Conservation status
- Least Concern (IUCN 3.1)

Scientific classification
- Kingdom: Plantae
- Clade: Tracheophytes
- Clade: Gymnosperms
- Division: Pinophyta
- Class: Pinopsida
- Order: Araucariales
- Family: Podocarpaceae
- Genus: Podocarpus
- Species: P. steyermarkii

Binomial name
- Podocarpus steyermarkii J.Buchholz & N.E.Gray

Species of conifer plant

Podocarpus steyermarkii is a species of conifer in the family Podocarpaceae. It is endemic to Venezuela.
