= Podocarpus bracteatus =

Conservation status
- Least Concern (IUCN 3.1)

Scientific classification
- Kingdom: Plantae
- Clade: Tracheophytes
- Clade: Gymnosperms
- Division: Pinophyta
- Class: Pinopsida
- Order: Araucariales
- Family: Podocarpaceae
- Genus: Podocarpus
- Species: P. bracteatus

Binomial name
- Podocarpus bracteatus Blume

Synonyms
- Nageia bracteata (Blume) F.Muell.; Podocarpus bracteatus var. brevipes Blume; Podocarpus neriifolius var. bracteatus (Blume) Wasscher; Podocarpus neriifolius var. brevipes (Blume) Pilg.

Species of conifer

Podocarpus bracteatus is a species of conifer in the family Podocarpaceae. It is native to the islands of Sumatra, Java, and Flores in Indonesia. It grows primarily in montane forests at elevations between 800 and 2,000 meters.

The species was described by Carl Ludwig Blume in 1827.
