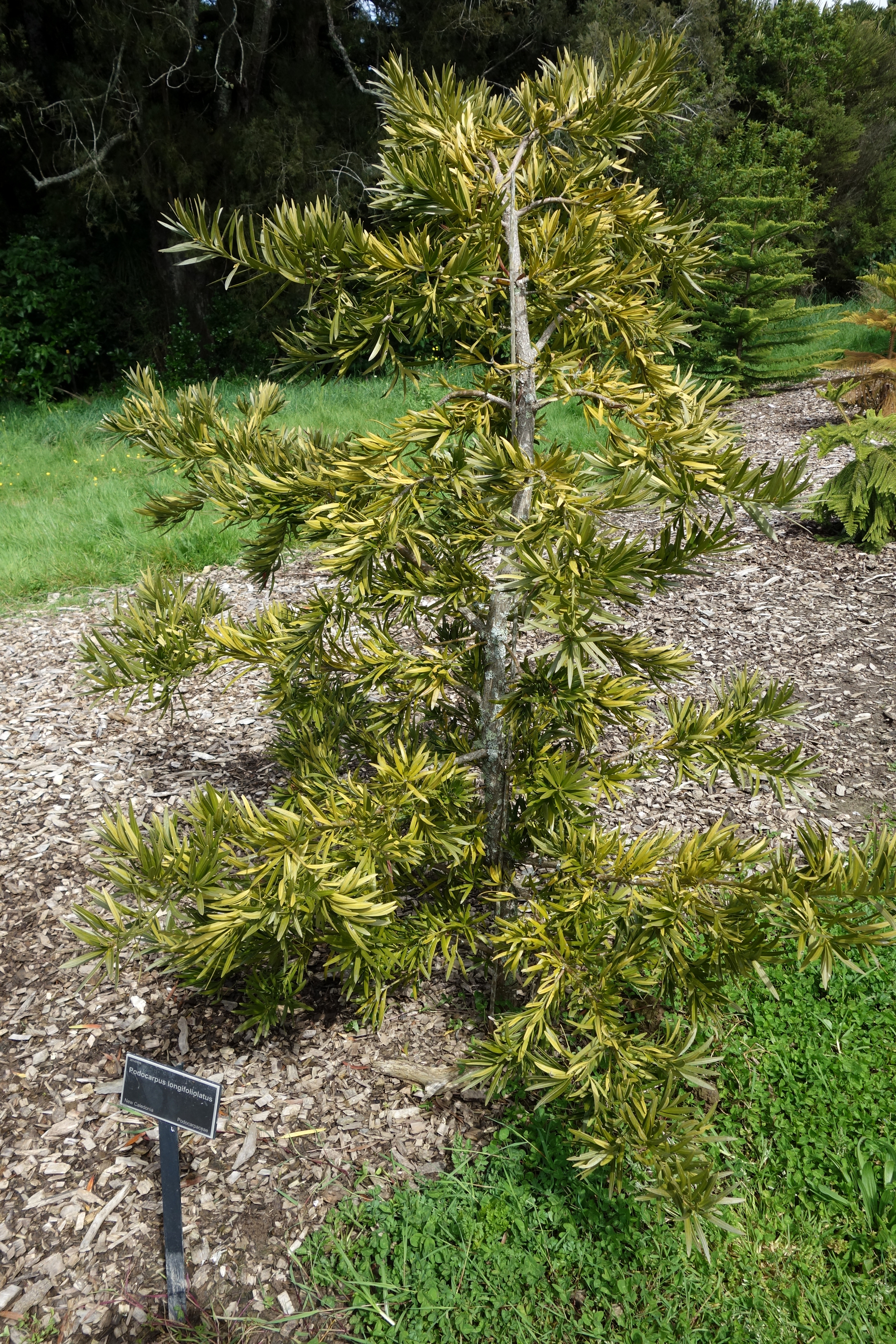

Conservation status
- Near Threatened (IUCN 3.1)

Scientific classification
- Kingdom: Plantae
- Clade: Tracheophytes
- Clade: Gymnosperms
- Division: Pinophyta
- Class: Pinopsida
- Order: Araucariales
- Family: Podocarpaceae
- Genus: Podocarpus
- Species: P. longifoliolatus

Binomial name
- Podocarpus longifoliolatus Pilg.

Synonyms
- Podocarpus letocartii A.D.Silba & J.A.Silva

= Podocarpus longifoliolatus =

Species of conifer

Podocarpus longifoliolatus is a species of conifer in the family Podocarpaceae. It is endemic to New Caledonia.

It is known from five high peaks in four locations – Mont Mou, Mé Maoya, Mt. Nakada, and Mont Nékandi – on Grande Terre, New Caledonia's main island. It grows in high-elevation montane rain forest from 1,000 to 1,400 metres elevation. It has an estimated extent of occurrence (EOO) of about 5,416 km^{2} and an area of occupancy of about 44 km^{2}. The species is assessed as near threatened by the IUCN.
