= Podocarpus decumbens =

Conservation status
- Endangered (IUCN 3.1)

Scientific classification
- Kingdom: Plantae
- Clade: Tracheophytes
- Clade: Gymnosperms
- Division: Pinophyta
- Class: Pinopsida
- Order: Araucariales
- Family: Podocarpaceae
- Genus: Podocarpus
- Species: P. decumbens

Binomial name
- Podocarpus decumbens N.E.Gray

Species of conifer

Podocarpus decumbens is a species of conifer in the family Podocarpaceae. It is a subshrub or shrub endemic to New Caledonia. It is known only from three sites on Montagne des Sources and Mount Kouakoué in southeastern Grande Terre, where it grows in high-elevation, high-rainfall shrubland (maquis) on ultramafic soils. Its native habitat is relatively inaccessible and in protected areas, yet is vulnerable to fires.

The species was described by Netta Elizabeth Gray in 1955.
