= Podocarpus ridleyi =

Conservation status
- Vulnerable (IUCN 3.1)

Scientific classification
- Kingdom: Plantae
- Clade: Tracheophytes
- Clade: Gymnosperms
- Division: Pinophyta
- Class: Pinopsida
- Order: Araucariales
- Family: Podocarpaceae
- Genus: Podocarpus
- Species: P. ridleyi

Binomial name
- Podocarpus ridleyi (Wasscher) N.E.Gray

Synonyms
- Margbensonia ridleyi (Wasscher) A.V.Bobrov & Melikyan; Podocarpus neriifolius var. ridleyi Wasscher

Species of conifer

Podocarpus ridleyi is a species of conifer in the family Podocarpaceae. It is a tree endemic to Peninsular Malaysia.
