= Podocarpus roraimae =

Conservation status
- Least Concern (IUCN 3.1)

Scientific classification
- Kingdom: Plantae
- Clade: Tracheophytes
- Clade: Gymnosperms
- Division: Pinophyta
- Class: Pinopsida
- Order: Araucariales
- Family: Podocarpaceae
- Genus: Podocarpus
- Species: P. roraimae

Binomial name
- Podocarpus roraimae Pilg.

Synonyms
- Podocarpus buchholzii de Laub.; Podocarpus buchholzii var. neblinensis Silba; Podocarpus buchholzii subsp. neblinensis (Silba) Silba

Species of conifer

Podocarpus roraimae is a species of conifer in the family Podocarpaceae. It is a shrub or small tree endemic to Mount Roraima on the border of southeastern Venezuela and Guyana.

It is native to tropical montane rainforest on isolated table mountains (tepuis) from 1,800 to 2,700 metres elevation. It often grows on open rocky plateaus and ravines or sinkholes among small trees and shrubs, including Bejaria sprucei, Daphnopsis steyermarkii, Palicourea jauaensis, Crepinella umbellata, and Weinmannia velutina.
