= Podocarpus tixieri =

Scientific classification
- Kingdom: Plantae
- Clade: Tracheophytes
- Clade: Gymnospermae
- Division: Pinophyta
- Class: Pinopsida
- Order: Araucariales
- Family: Podocarpaceae
- Genus: Podocarpus
- Species: P. tixieri

Binomial name
- Podocarpus tixieri Gaussen ex Silba (2008)

Species of conifer

Podocarpus tixieri is a species of conifer in family Podocarpaceae. It is a tree native to southeastern Thailand and southern Cambodia.
