= Podocarpus orarius =

Conservation status
- Near Threatened (IUCN 3.1)

Scientific classification
- Kingdom: Plantae
- Clade: Tracheophytes
- Clade: Gymnosperms
- Division: Pinophyta
- Class: Pinopsida
- Order: Araucariales
- Family: Podocarpaceae
- Genus: Podocarpus
- Species: P. orarius

Binomial name
- Podocarpus orarius R.R.Mill & M.Whiting (2012)

Synonyms
- Podocarpus spathoides subsp. solomonensis (Silba) Silba (2010); Podocarpus spathoides var. solomonensis Silba (2000)

Species of conifer

Podocarpus orarius is a species of conifer in the family Podocarpaceae. It is a tree native to the Louisiade Archipelago east of New Guinea, and to Choiseul, Guadalcanal, and Santa Isabel islands in the southern Solomon Islands. It is a large tree, growing up to 35 meters tall. It grows in tropical coastal and lowland rainforest from sea level to 60 meters elevation, and up to 460 m on Guadalcanal.
