= Podocarpus decipiens =

Scientific classification
- Kingdom: Plantae
- Clade: Tracheophytes
- Clade: Gymnosperms
- Division: Pinophyta
- Class: Pinopsida
- Order: Araucariales
- Family: Podocarpaceae
- Genus: Podocarpus
- Species: P. decipiens

Binomial name
- Podocarpus decipiens N.E.Gray (1955)

Synonyms
- Podocarpus neriifolius subsp. decipiens (N.E.Gray) Silba (2010); Podocarpus neriifolius var. decipiens (N.E.Gray) Silba (2000)

Species of conifer

Podocarpus decipiens is a species of coniferous tree in the family Podocarpaceae. It is endemic to the island of Viti Levu in Fiji.
