= Podocarpus rumphii =

Conservation status
- Near Threatened (IUCN 3.1)

Scientific classification
- Kingdom: Plantae
- Clade: Tracheophytes
- Clade: Gymnosperms
- Division: Pinophyta
- Class: Pinopsida
- Order: Araucariales
- Family: Podocarpaceae
- Genus: Podocarpus
- Species: P. rumphii

Binomial name
- Podocarpus rumphii Blume (1847 publ. 1849)

Synonyms
- Cerbera nereifolia Zipp. (1830); Margbensonia koordersii (Pilg. ex Koord. & Valeton) A.V.Bobrov & Melikyan (1998); Margbensonia philippinensis (Foxw.) A.V.Bobrov & Melikyan (1998); Margbensonia rumphii (Blume) A.V.Bobrov & Melikyan (1998); Nageia rumphii (Blume) F.Muell. (1877); Podocarpus bracteatus Hassk. (1866), nom. illeg.; Podocarpus koordersii Pilg. ex Koord. & Valeton (1904); Podocarpus philippinensis Foxw. (1911); Podocarpus rumphii subsp. arbainii (Silba) Silba (2010); Podocarpus rumphii var. arbainii Silba (2000); Podocarpus sprengelii Blume in Flora 7: 292 (1824), not validly publ.

Species of conifer from Asia

Podocarpus rumphii is a species of conifer in the family Podocarpaceae. It is native to Hainan (southern China), Malesia (Indonesia, Malaysia, and the Philippines) and New Guinea (Indonesia and Papua New Guinea).
