= David John de Laubenfels =

American botanist (1925–2016)

- Born: 1925 (age 100–101)
- Died: U.S.
- Education: University of Illinois; Cornell University
- Known for: Classification of Podocarpaceae; Tropical conifer expertise
- Scientific career
- Fields: Botany, taxonomy, geomorphology
- Workplaces: Syracuse University
- Author abbrev. (botany): de Laub.

David John de Laubenfels or D. J. de Laubenfels (1925 – February 6, 2016) was an American botanist known as an expert on tropical conifers.

== See also ==
- Max Walker de Laubenfels
