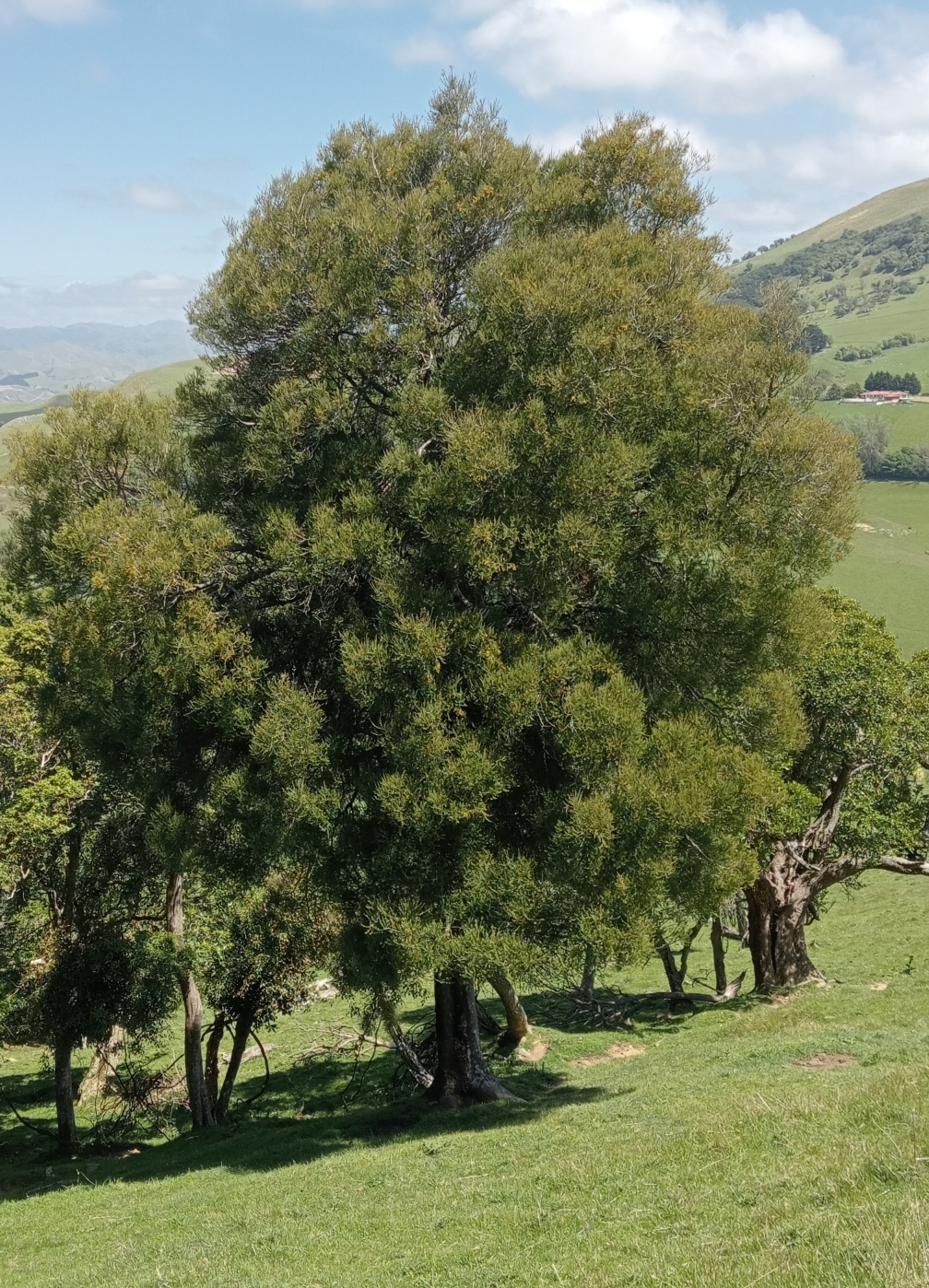
- A mature P. taxifolia specimen in Waikouaiti

Conservation status
- Least Concern (IUCN 3.1)

- Not Threatened (NZ TCS)

Scientific classification
- Kingdom: Plantae
- Clade: Tracheophytes
- Clade: Gymnosperms
- Division: Pinophyta
- Class: Pinopsida
- Order: Araucariales
- Family: Podocarpaceae
- Genus: Prumnopitys
- Species: P. taxifolia

Binomial name
- Prumnopitys taxifolia (Banks & Sol. ex D. Don) de Laub.

Synonyms
- Dacrydium taxifolium Lamb. Podocarpus spicatus R.Br. Dacrydium mai A.Cunn. Stachycarpus spicatus Tiegh. Prumnopitys taxifolia de Laub.

= Prumnopitys taxifolia =

Species of coniferous tree

Prumnopitys taxifolia, commonly known as mataī and black pine, is a species of tree in the family Podocarpaceae. It is a dioecious evergreen conifer reaching 30 metres (100 feet) in height, with a stout trunk up to 2 m (6 ft 7 in) in diameter, typically inhabiting lowland to montane forests. It is endemic to New Zealand; its range mainly covers the North and South Islands, it is also found on Stewart Island, but is uncommon there. P. taxifolia is a slow-growing tree and is highly shade-tolerant. P. taxifolia is profoundly heteroblastic; its young form is distinct and resembles a divaricating-wiry shrub, which may last for up to 60 years. It is unknown why P. taxifolia developed this characteristic. P. taxifolia has an average lifespan of 600 years, although it sometimes may live longer than 1000 years.

Prumnopitys taxifolia was first described by the British botanist Aylmer Bourke Lambert in 1832. The fruits of P. taxifolia are dispersed by fruit-eating animals (frugivores), and the tree is pollinated by the wind. It is common on fertile and well-drained soils, although it can still grow well in drier climates. P. taxifolia's timber is noted for its strength and durability, and was historically used for building bridges and houses, railway sleepers, and furniture-making. The conservation status of P. taxifolia was assessed by the IUCN Red List in 2013 as "Least Concern".

== Description ==
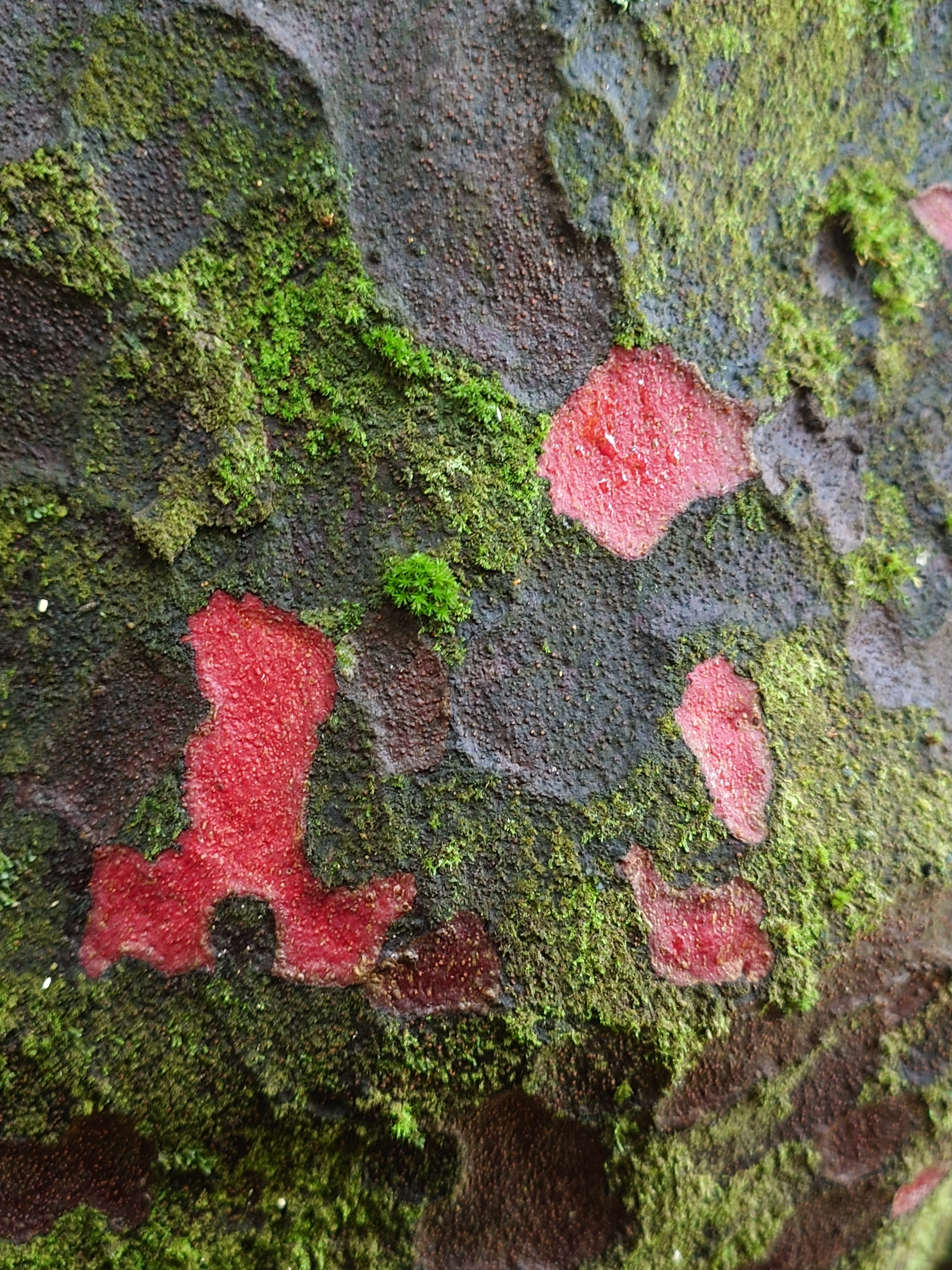
Hammer-like marks on the bark of a mature tree

Prumnopitys taxifolia is a species of dioecious evergreen conifer in the family Podocarpaceae, reaching heights of 30 metres (100 feet), with a stout trunk of up to 1–2 metres (3 feet 3 inches – 6 feet 7 inches) in diameter. Branches are initially ascending and eventually become spreading, forming a domed or rounded crown. The bark is thin and smooth (particularly on younger trees); it has spots, similar to hammer marks, which are red or purplish-brown in colour when fresh, weathering into a dark brown to black colour, and peeling freely into thick flakes. The outer bark itself can vary in colour from a dark brown to an almost black colour. The wood is very dense, hard, and has a dark brown to a yellow-brown colour. P. taxifolia has an average lifespan of 600 years, although a specimen from Tongariro National Park is estimated to have lived for more than 1000 years.

Prumnopitys taxifolia's young form is distinct and the species profoundly exhibits heteroblasty (a significant change in a plant's form). Its young form, resembles a tangled shrub, is so distinct that the first botanists in New Zealand initially thought they were separate species. Unlike the related miro (Pectinopitys ferruginea), P. taxifolia has a distinctive and long-lasting young stage, which is a tangle of slender, flexible, divaricating branchlets. After several decades, the plant begins to grow out of the young shrub and the divaricating branchlets will drop off. It is unknown why this species developed this characteristic; one possibility is that the tangled branches are designed to create a warm temperature inside the shrub, hence the species could survive in colder climates, or it may serve as a defence against browsing animals. The young stage can last for up to 60 years.

Young leaves are 5–10 × 1–2 mm long and brown to pale yellow in colour, narrow and tapering, with a pointed tip, and they can have long whip-like shoots. Adult leaves are 10–15 × 1–2 mm long, dark green in colour, glaucous, subdistichous and often apiculate in character. They generally have a broad shape, but can be more pectinate in character, and are (6–)10–20 mm long, (1–)1.5–2 mm wide. Leaves are widest near the middle, with nearly parallel sides. The midrib is raised on a bluish-green surface, where there are waxy, pale bluish-green bands of stomata. The Canadian botanist, James Emory Eckenwalder, suggested that the leaves of P. taxifolia potentially contain unidentified physiologically active compounds.

Like all conifers, P. taxifolia does not produce flowers or true fruits, but instead produces pollen and seed in cones, or 'pseudo-fruits'. The species is dioecious, with male and female reproductive structures on separate trees. The ovules are found on short axillary branches, with 3–10 per a 40 mm long spike. P. taxifolia's male pollen cones are found on nearly leafless lateral and axillary spikes near the ends of foliage branches. Each spike is yellow in colour, and can have up to 10–30 cones per spike, each 5–12 mm long and approximately 2 mm wide. The seed cones take 12–18 months to mature and are found throughout the year. They are round to oval in shape, fleshy, globe-shaped or nearly spherical, purplish-black in colour, and about 8–10 mm wide. P. taxifolia has a diploid chromosome count of 38.

=== Phytochemistry ===
The sap of P. taxifolia contains matairesinol, a compound which has been investigated in cancer research. In addition to matairesinol, the heartwood of the tree contains numerous other compounds, which includes, but is not limited to aromadendrin, kaempferol, quercetin, and genistein. Foliage oils of the tree were investigated in 1987 in the scientific journal Phytochemistry. Researchers found 7 sesquiterpene hydrocarbons and 2 oxygenated sesquiterpenes, 10 diterpene hydrocarbons, and 2 oxygenated diterpenes (including ferruginol) were identified.

== Gallery ==
A lofty P. taxifolia tree with large spreading branches.

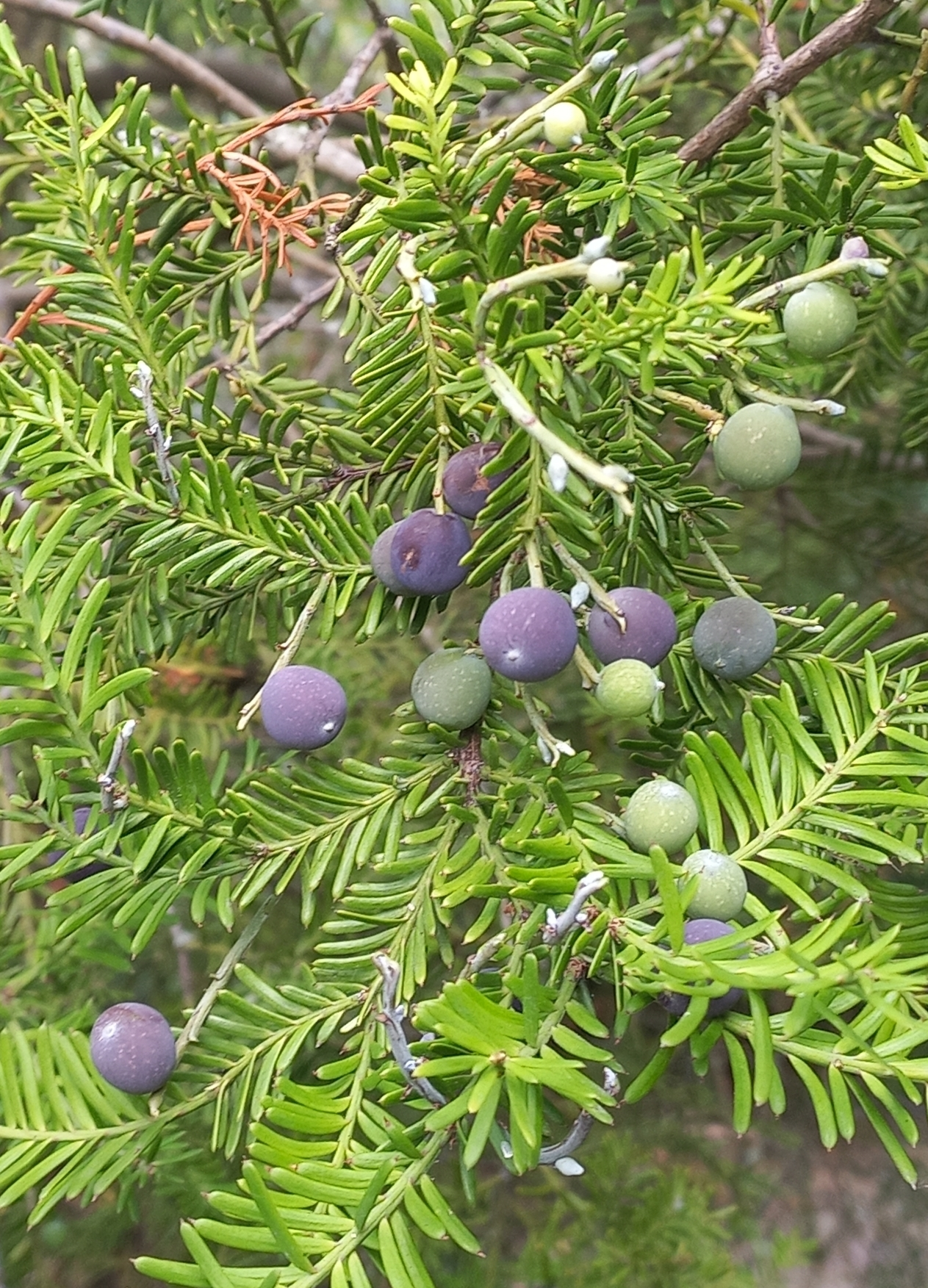
P. taxifolia's purple-black-coloured globe-shaped drupes.

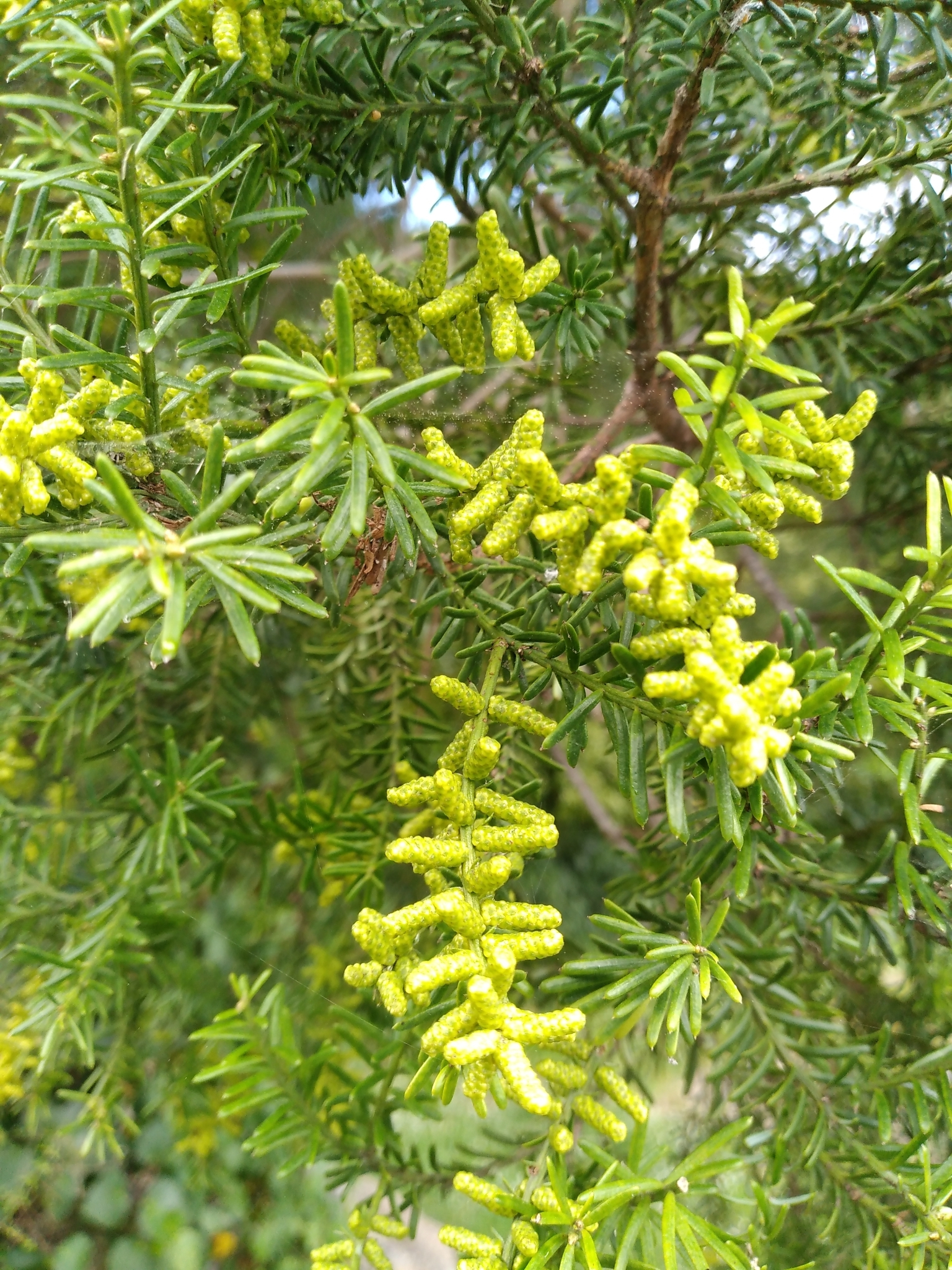
The pollen cones are 30–50 mm long, with up to 30 cones per spike.

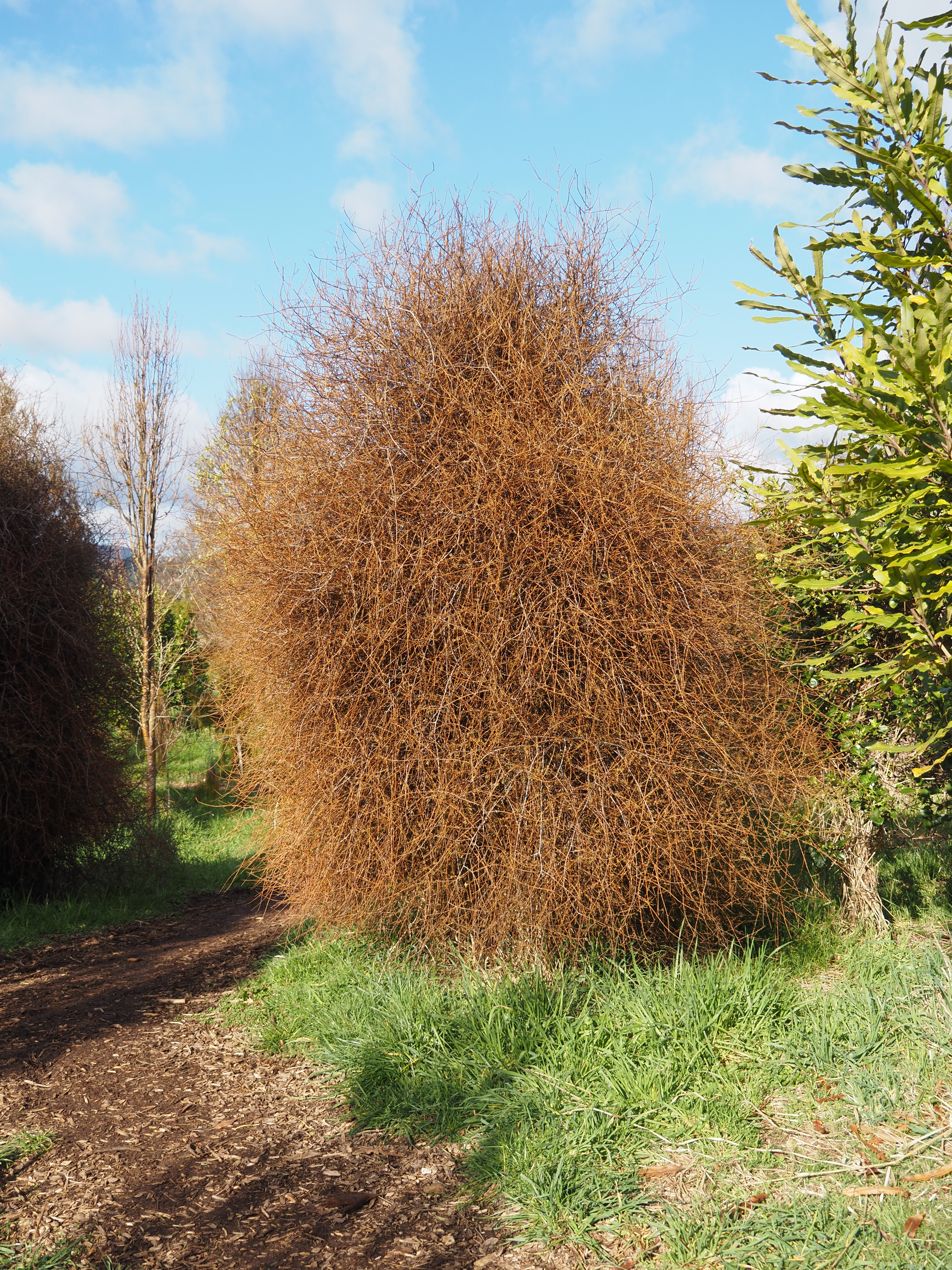
Before P. taxifolia exhibits heteroblasty, it resembles a divaricating-wiry shrub.

== Taxonomy ==
=== Classification ===
- - - Sundacarpus amarus
  - - - Prumnopitys andina
      - - Prumnopitys taxifolia
        - Prumnopitys montana
    - - Pectinopitys ladei
      - - Pectinopitys ferruginea
        - Pectinopitys ferruginoides

Cladogram depicting the relationships of the species within the genera Pectinopitys, Prumnopitys and Sundacarpus.

Prumnopitys taxifolia is a member of the genus Prumnopitys, which consists of five species across Australasia and South America. P. taxifolia is categorised in the subgenus Prumnopitys. In 2019 the British botanist Chris Page transferred six species from Prumnopitys into a genus Page newly described as Pectinopitys. Page retained three species within the genus Prumnopitys, including P. taxifolia. He based his move on cladistic, morphological, and molecular analysis, concluding that Pectinopitys was distinct enough for it to be described as a new genus, rather than retaining it in Prumnopitys. Page also mentioned that Pectinopitys has a diploid chromosome count of 2n = 36, while Prumnopitys has a count of 2n = 38. Khan et al. (2022) reported that Prumnopitys montana of South America, is the closest relative to P. taxifolia. A 2012 study based on rbcL data sequencing revealed that both species are nearly allied to species within the genus Pectinopitys (formerly placed within the same genus).

=== History ===
Prumnopitys taxifolia was first described as Dacrydium taxifolium by the British botanist Aylmer Lambert in his work A Description of the Genus Pinus. It is the basionym (original scientific name) of the species. P. taxifolia was described as Dacrydium mai and Podocarpus spicatus in 1838. The species was attempted to be renamed to Stachycarpus spicatus in 1891 by the French botanist Philippe Édouard Léon Van Tieghem. American botanist David John de Laubenfels described it as Prumnopitys taxifolia in 1978, which is its currently recognised binomial name.

=== Etymology ===
The etymology of P. taxifolia's genus name, Prumnopitys, is uncertain. One possibility is that the name means 'plum-fruited pine', which derives from the Greek prunum, which means 'plum', and pitys which means 'fir' or 'pine'. Gledhill (2008) disputes this, and states the genus name means 'hindmost-pine'. The specific epithet refers to the 'yew-like' leaves of the species, deriving from the Latin taxus, which is in reference to Taxus baccata. The species is commonly known as the mataī and or black pine. The word 'mataī' is possibly a combination of the Māori language words 'mata' ('unripe'), and 'ī' ('fermented' or 'sour'); referring to the bitter taste of resin from the trunk. In 1908 the New Zealand ethnographer Elsdon Best recorded that young trees are also known in Māori as kāī, kākāī, and māī. Herbert Williams recorded that the trees are also known as kaimātai.

== Ecology ==
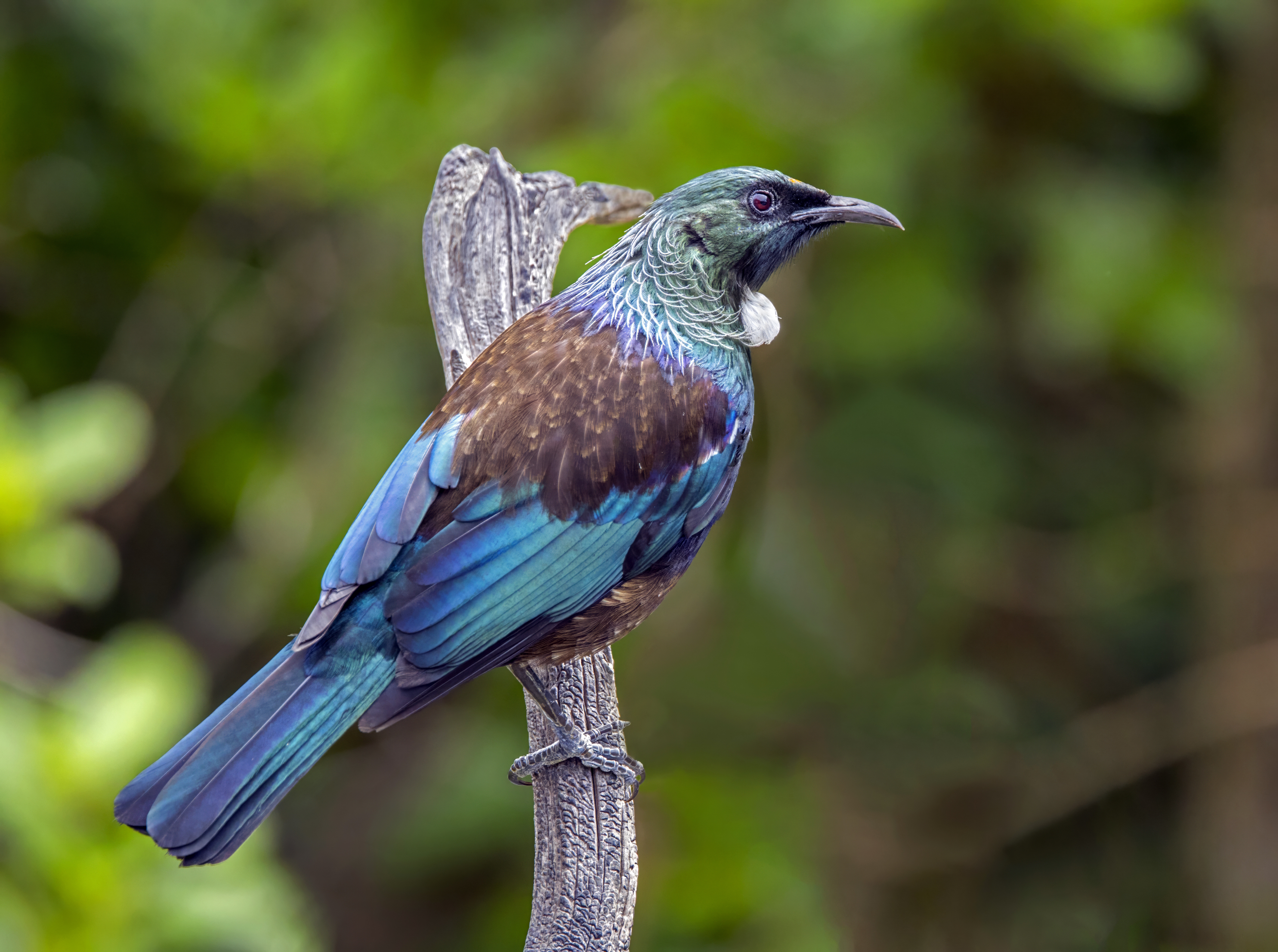
The native bird, tūī, has been recorded as a disperser of P. taxifolia's fruits.

Prumnopitys taxifolia's fruits are dispersed by fruit-eating animals (frugivores), such as birds. The fruits of P. taxifolia reflect some ultraviolet radiation, which is visible to some species of birds and vertebrates, although they do not reflect as strongly as Dacrycarpus dacrydioides. A 1989 study, published in the New Zealand Journal of Ecology, recorded the kererū (Hemiphaga novaeseelandiae), kōkako (Callaeas wilsoni), tūī (Prosthemadera novaeseelandiae), and weka (Gallirallus australis) as dispersers of the fruits of P. taxifolia. The fruits are also eaten by introduced blackbirds (Turdus merula) and song thrushes (T. philomelos). The kākā (Nestor meridionalis) have been recorded destroying the fruits of P. taxifolia. The seeds of P. taxifolia are eaten by the larvae of Heterocrossa iophaea. P. taxifolia is a host to the native beetles, Ambeodontus tristis and Prionoplus reticularis.

A 2012 study found that P. taxifolia fruits can still germinate after being excreted by feral pigs (Sus scrofa), with a success rate of 57 percent. A 2021 study hypothesised P. taxifolia's fruits were consumed by the extinct little bush moa (Anomalopteryx didiformis), although in low quantities when compared to other native species at the studied site at Borland Burn in Fiordland National Park. P. taxifolia can play host to epiphytes (plants that grow on other plants) of the genus Astelia. In 2023 a study published in MycoKeys, examined three Chaenothecopsis lichen species that grow primarily on the exudates of P. taxifolia. One of these species, C. matai, was named after the tree. P. taxifolia is sensitive to fire and has a moderate flammability rate.

=== Reproduction ===
Like all conifers, the ovules of P. taxifolia are pollinated by the wind. The cones of P. taxifolia have an elongated central axis with about twelve ovules. Each ovule is positioned beneath arranged bracts (specialised leaves). At the base of each bract, there is a groove that forms a small gutter around the ovule. During pollination, pollen collects into the grooves before and after a drop of secretion appears, helping to capture pollen efficiently.

== Distribution ==
Prumnopitys taxifolia is endemic to New Zealand; its range primarily covers the North and South Islands. It also occurs on Stewart Island, but it is extremely uncommon there. In The Forest Flora of New Zealand, published in 1889, Thomas Kirk reported only one specimen growing on the southern side of Halfmoon Bay. Kirk also noted that the species was very common in the central areas of the North Island and in the western and south-western parts of the South Island.

The conservation status of P. taxifolia was assessed by the IUCN Red List in 2013 as "Least Concern", and its population trend was evaluated as "Stable". Its assessment in the New Zealand Threat Classification System was evaluated in 2023 as "Not Threatened".

=== Habitat ===
Prumnopitys taxifolia is typically found in lowland and montane forests. It occurs from 20–1,000 m (70–3,000 ft) above sea level. It is commonly found on mountain slopes and grows in fertile, well-drained soils. In the eastern regions of both islands, where rainfall is relatively low, the tree can still grow well in the drier climates. The largest specimens of P. taxifolia have been found growing in deep pumiceous soils or in lime-rich soils beneath limestone escarpments. Similar to Pectinopitys ferruginea, the tree is commonly found on alluvial soils in the West Coast Region of the South Island. P. taxifolia commonly coincides with southern beech (Nothofagus) species in the South Island's West Coast Region. P. taxifolia is a slow-growing, wind-resistant tree that is highly shade-tolerant, which can regenerate fully under closed canopy.

== Uses ==
=== In Māori culture ===
[...] this pine resembles the English Yew in the form of its leaf; the fruit is a black, or purple berry, about the size of a wild cherry; it is sweet and rather slimy, but of an agreeable flavour.

— Richard Taylor, 1848

The timber is highly valued by the indigenous Māori people for its durability and hardiness and had a variety of uses, including being a prized timber for building waka (canoes), carving and building tools, and making traditional instruments, such as a pūkaea, a trumpet, which signals a war. Other uses of the timber included it being used for bowls, containers, combs, spades, troughs, and weapons. The young divaricating form of the tree has flexible stems which were used by Māori to make hīnaki (eel pots).

Prumnopitys taxifolia's fruits are edible and are described as sweet, fragrant, and rather slimy in taste. Another source from 1853 described them as "very glutinous". They were collected by Māori in large baskets, and then eaten.

According to Best, the Māori seem recognise two different varieties of the tree. In Māori mythology, the blood-red colour of the inner bark of mature trees linked to the blood of Tunaroa, a mythological god, who was killed by Māui, a cultural hero in Polynesian culture.

=== In European culture ===
Although P. taxifolia had some uses as a timber, it was historically considered inferior to the kauri (Agathis australis) and rimu (Dacrydium cupressinum). P. taxifolia's timber is noted for its strength and durability, and was historically used for building bridges, house building, especially for flooring and weatherboards, and railway sleepers. It was also used, to a lesser degree, for furniture-making. Although commonly known as black pine to early European settlers, an 1853 source mentions that the tree was also known as maiberry to early settlers.

Another important resource from the tree is the sap exuded from the trunk, which is also edible, and is described as sweet and bitter in taste, similar to the fruits. The sap produces a rich brown-coloured beverage, termed mataī beer by Europeans. The sap is also brewed into a modern-day alcoholic beverage.

== Works cited ==
Books

- Best, Elsdon (1908). Transactions and Proceedings of the New Zealand Institute. Vol. 40. Wellington, New Zealand: Transactions and Proceedings of the Royal Society of New Zealand.
- Cheeseman, T. F. (1906). Manual of the New Zealand flora (1 ed.). Wellington, New Zealand: Government of New Zealand.
- Crowe, Andrew (2009). Which Native Tree? New Zealand Native Trees: A Simple Guide to their Identification, Ecology and Uses. Auckland, New Zealand: Penguin Books. ISBN 978-0-14-300899-6.
- Dawson, John; Lucas, Rob (2011). Field Guide to New Zealand's Native Trees. Nelson, New Zealand: Potton & Burton. ISBN 978-1-877517-01-3.
- Eckenwalder, James E. (2009). Conifers of the World. Portland, United States: Timber Press. ISBN 978-0-88192-974-4.
- Farjon, Aljos (2017). A Handbook of the World's Conifers. Vol. 2. Boston, United States: Brill Publishers. ISBN 978-90-04-32451-0.
- Gledhill, David (2008). The Names of Plants. Cambridge, United Kingdom: Cambridge University Press. ISBN 978-0-521-68553-5.
- Kirk, Thomas (1889). The Forest Flora of New Zealand. Wellington, New Zealand: Government of New Zealand.
- Lambert, Aylmer Bourke; Don, David; Bauer, Ferdinand (1803). A Description of the Genus Pinus [...]. London, United Kingdom: J. White. doi:10.5962/bhl.title.44704.
- Metcalf, Lawrie (2000). New Zealand Trees and Shrubs: A Comprehensive Guide to Cultivation and Identification. Auckland, New Zealand: Reed Publishing. ISBN 0-7900-0662-6.
- Salmon, John Tenison (1986). The Native Trees of New Zealand. Auckland, New Zealand: Raupo Press. ISBN 978-0-7900-0104-3.
- Taylor, Richard (1848). A Leaf from the Natural History of New Zealand or, a Vocabulary of its Different Productions &c. [et cetra], with their native names. Wellington, New Zealand: Robert Stokes.
- Vennell, Robert (2019). The Meaning of Trees. Auckland, New Zealand: HarperCollins. ISBN 978-1-77554-130-1.
- Wardle, J. (2011). Wardle's Native Plants of New Zealand and Their Story. Bateson Publishing Limited. ISBN 9781877520068.
- Williams, Herbert William (1917). A Dictionary of the Maori Language (in Māori). Wellington, New Zealand: Polynesian Society.

Journals

- Beimforde, Christina; Schmidt, Alexander R.; Tuovila, Hanna; Kaulfuss, Uwe; Germer, Juliane; Lee, William G.; Rikkinen, Jouko (2023). "Chaenothecopsis (Mycocaliciales, Ascomycota) from exudates of endemic New Zealand Podocarpaceae". MycoKeys. 95. Pensoft Publishers: 101–129. doi:10.3897/mycokeys.95.97601. ISSN 1314-4049.
- Beveridge, A. E. (1964). "Animal Modification of Native Vegetation: Dispersal and Destruction of Seed in central North Island Podocarp Forests". Proceedings of the New Zealand Ecological Society. 11 (48–56). ISSN 0110-6465.
- Boswijk, Gretel; Loader, Neil J.; Young, Giles H.F.; Hogg, Alan (2021). "Developing tree-ring chronologies from New Zealand matai (Prumnopitys taxifolia) and miro (Prumnopitys ferruginea) for archaeological dating: Progress and problems". Dendrochronologia. 69 125876. doi:10.1016/j.dendro.2021.125876.
- Briggs, L.H.; Cambie, R.C.; Hoare, J.L. (1959). "Chemistry of the Podocarpaceae—III". Tetrahedron. 7 (3–4). Elsevier BV: 262–269. doi:10.1016/s0040-4020(01)93195-3. ISSN 0040-4020.
- Clout, M.N.; Hay, J. R. (1989). "The Importance of Birds as Browsers, Pollinators and Seed Dispersers in New Zealand Forests". New Zealand Journal of Ecology. 12. New Zealand Ecological Society: 27–33. ISSN 0110-6465. JSTOR 24053245.
- Cunningham, Allan (1838). "Annals of Natural History". Journal of Natural History. 1. R. and J.E. Taylor. ISSN 2634-0445.
- De Laubenfels, David J. (1978). "The genus Prumnopitys (Podocarpaceae) in Malesia". Blumea: Biodiversity, Evolution and Biogeography of Plants. 24 (1): 189–190. ISSN 2212-1676.
- Khan, Raees; Hill, Robert S; Dörken, Veit M; Biffin, Ed (17 November 2022). "Detailed seed cone morpho-anatomy of the Prumnopityoid clade: an insight into the origin and evolution of Podocarpaceae seed cones" (PDF). Annals of Botany. 130 (5): 637–655. doi:10.1093/aob/mcac097. ISSN 0305-7364.
- Knopf, Patrick; Schulz, Christian; Little, Damon P.; Stützel, Thomas; Stevenson, Dennis W. (2012). "Relationships within Podocarpaceae based on DNA sequence, anatomical, morphological, and biogeographical data". Cladistics. 28 (3): 271–299. doi:10.1111/j.1096-0031.2011.00381.x. ISSN 0748-3007.
- Lee, W.G.; Hodgkinson, I.J.; Johnson, P.N. (1990). "A test for ultraviolet reflectance from fleshy fruits of New Zealand plant species". New Zealand Journal of Botany. 28 (1): 21–24. Bibcode:1990NZJB...28...21L. doi:10.1080/0028825X.1990.10412340. ISSN 0028-825X.
- Lorimer, Stephen D.; Weavers, Rex T. (1987). "Foliage Sesquiterpenes and Diterpenes of Podocarpus spicatus". Phytochemistry. 26 (12). Elsevier BV: 3207–3215. doi:10.1016/s0031-9422(00)82471-1. ISSN 0031-9422.
- Lusk, Chris; Ogden, John (1992). "Age Structure and Dynamics of a Podocarp–Broadleaf Forest in Tongariro National Park, New Zealand". Journal of Ecology. 80 (3): 379. Bibcode:1992JEcol..80..379L. doi:10.2307/2260684. JSTOR 2260684.
- Marshall, Grace; Wyse, Sarah; Manley, Bruce; Forbes, Adam (2023). "International use of exotic plantations for native forest restoration and implications for Aotearoa New Zealand" (PDF). New Zealand Journal of Ecology. New Zealand Ecological Society. doi:10.20417/nzjecol.47.3516. ISSN 0110-6465.
- Mitchell, Antigone E. T.; Logan, Barry A.; Reblin, Jaret S.; Burns, Kevin C.; Gould, Kevin S. (2020). "Photosynthetic properties of juvenile Prumnopitys taxifolia (Podocarpaceae), a divaricate and heteroblastic conifer". New Zealand Journal of Botany. 58 (1): 19–29. doi:10.1080/0028825X.2019.1659833. ISSN 0028-825X.
- O'Connor, Sarah-Jane; Kelly, Dave (2012). "Seed dispersal of matai (Prumnopitys taxifolia) by feral pigs (Sus scrofa)". New Zealand Journal of Ecology. 36 (2). New Zealand Ecological Society: 228–231. ISSN 0110-6465. JSTOR 24060850.
- Page, Christopher N. (2019). "New and maintained genera in the taxonomic alliance of Prumnopitys s.l. (Podocarpaceae), and circumscription of a new genus: Pectinopitys". New Zealand Journal of Botany. 57 (3): 137–153. Bibcode:2019NZJB...57..137P. doi:10.1080/0028825X.2019.1625933. ISSN 0028-825X.
- Perry, George L. W.; Wilmshurst, Janet M.; McGlone, Matt S. (2014). "Ecology and long-term history of fire in New Zealand". New Zealand Journal of Ecology. 38 (2). New Zealand Ecological Society: 157–176. ISSN 0110-6465. JSTOR 24060795.
- Sullivan, Jon J.; Burrows, Colin J.; Dugdale, John S. (1995). "Insect predation of seeds of native New Zealand woody plants in some central South Island localities". New Zealand Journal of Botany. 33 (3): 355–364. Bibcode:1995NZJB...33..355S. doi:10.1080/0028825X.1995.10412962. ISSN 0028-825X.
- Sopow, Stephanie L.; Bain, John (2017). "A checklist of New Zealand Cerambycidae (Insecta: Coleoptera), excluding Lamiinae". New Zealand Entomologist. 40 (2): 55–71. Bibcode:2017NZEnt..40...55S. doi:10.1080/00779962.2017.1357423. ISSN 0077-9962.
- Tomlinson, P. B.; Braggins, J. E.; Rattenbury, J. A. (1991). "Pollination Drop in Relation to Cone Morphology in Podocarpaceae: A Novel Reproductive Mechanism". American Journal of Botany. 78 (9). Wiley: 1289–1303. Bibcode:1991AmJB...78.1289T. doi:10.1002/j.1537-2197.1991.tb11421.x. ISSN 0002-9122. JSTOR 2444932.
- Wood, Jamie R.; Vermeulen, Melanie J.; Bolstridge, Nicola; Briden, Shar; Cole, Theresa L.; Rivera-Perez, Jessica; Shepherd, Lara D.; Rawlence, Nicolas J.; Wilmshurst, Janet M. (2021). "Mid-holocene Coprolites From Southern New Zealand Provide New Insights Into the Diet and Ecology of the Extinct Little Bush Moa (Anomalopteryx didiformis)". Quaternary Science Reviews. 263 106992. Bibcode:2021QSRv..26306992W. doi:10.1016/j.quascirev.2021.106992.
- Wu, Shenshen; Wang, Jiajia; Fu, Zan; Familiari, Giuseppe; Relucenti, Michela; Aschner, Michael; Li, Xiaobo; Chen, Hanqing; Chen, Rui (2023). "Matairesinol Nanoparticles Restore Chemosensitivity and Suppress Colorectal Cancer Progression in Preclinical Models: Role of Lipid Metabolism Reprogramming". Nano Letters. 23 (5): 1970–1980. doi:10.1021/acs.nanolett.3c00035. ISSN 1530-6984.

Websites

- De Lange, Peter (2025). "Prumnopitys taxifolia". New Zealand Plant Conservation Network. Archived from the original on 26 April 2025.
- Farjon, Aljos (2013). "Prumnopitys taxifolia". IUCN Red List of Threatened Species. 2013 e.T42541A2986139. doi:10.2305/IUCN.UK.2013-1.RLTS.T42541A2986139.en.
- "Prumnopitys taxifolia (Sol. ex D.Don) de Laub". Plants of the World Online. Archived from the original on 25 April 2025 – via Royal Botanic Gardens, Kew.
- "Ngā Rauropi Whakaoranga — Prumnopitys taxifolia. Mataī". Manaaki Whenua – Landcare Research. 2023. Archived from the original on 10 February 2025.
