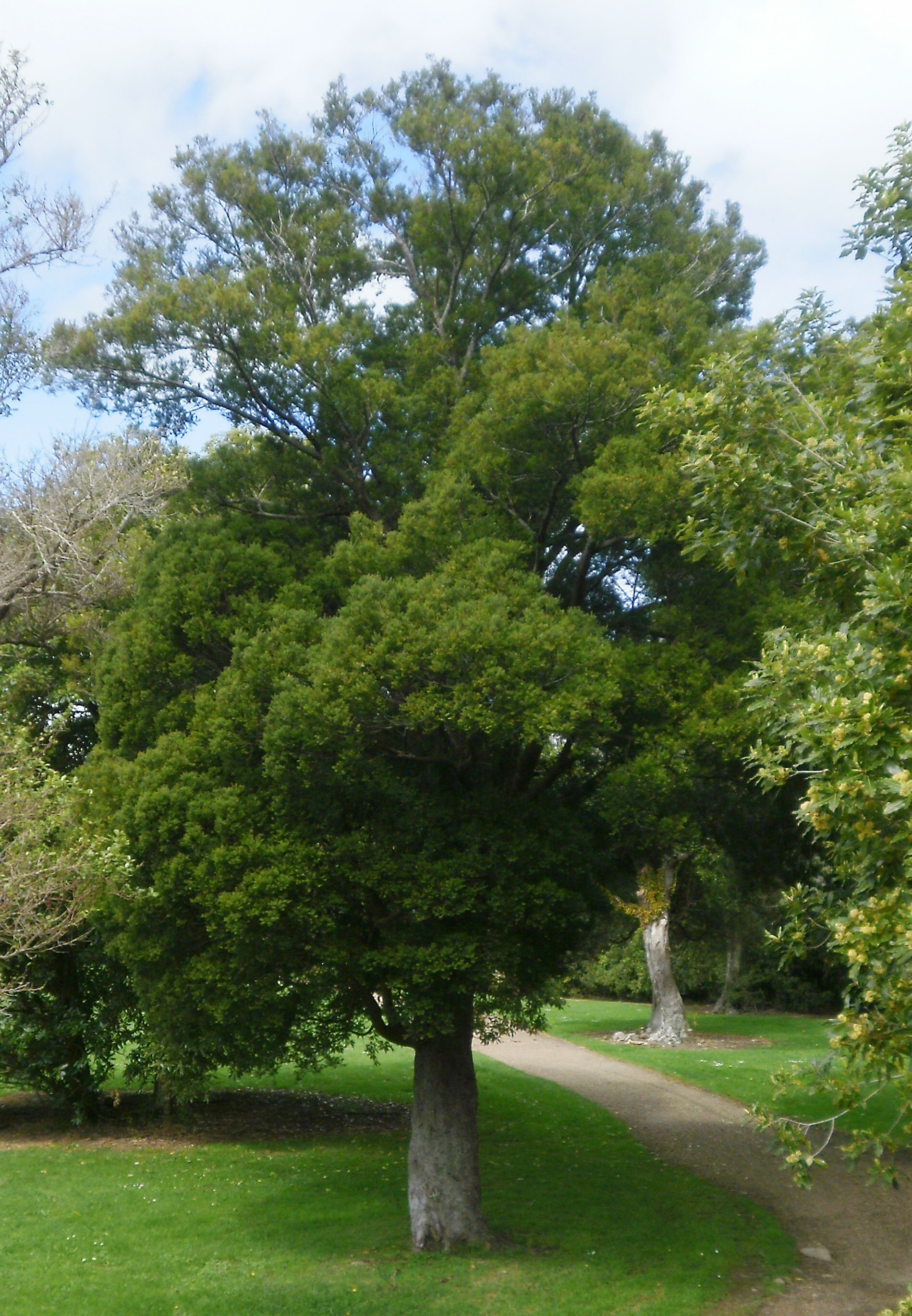
- A mature P. ferruginea specimen in a garden in Lower Hutt, New Zealand

Conservation status
- Least Concern (IUCN 3.1)

Scientific classification
- Kingdom: Plantae
- Clade: Tracheophytes
- Clade: Gymnosperms
- Division: Pinophyta
- Class: Pinopsida
- Order: Araucariales
- Family: Podocarpaceae
- Genus: Pectinopitys
- Species: P. ferruginea

Binomial name
- Pectinopitys ferruginea (G.Benn. ex D.Don) C.N.Page

Synonyms
- Podocarpus ferrugineus Lamb. Nageia ferruginea F.Muell. Stachycarpus ferrugineus Spreng; Prumnopitys ferruginea de Laub.

= Pectinopitys ferruginea =

Species of coniferous tree

Pectinopitys ferruginea, commonly known as miro and brown pine, is a species of tree in the family Podocarpaceae. It is a dioecious evergreen conifer, reaching heights of up to 25 metres (80 feet), with a trunk up to 1–1.5 metres (3–5 ft) in diameter. It is endemic to New Zealand; its range mainly covers the North, South, and Stewart Islands, typically inhabiting lowland to montane forests. Its leaves are dark-green to bronze-green in colour, and are pectinate, meaning they are arranged closely together, similar to a comb. The berry-like cones of P. ferruginea are red to pinkish-red in colour and are up to 20 mm long. P. ferruginea has an estimated lifespan of 250–350 years, although it may live as long as 770 years.

P. ferrugina was first described by the British botanist Aylmer Bourke Lambert in 1832. The species has had several other scientific synonyms up until 2019, when the British botanist Chris Page moved this species to a newly-described genus, Pectinopitys, rather than Prumnopitys, based on cytogenetic, molecular and morphological analyses. The cones of P. ferruginea are an important food source for numerous birds, and especially the kererū (Hemiphaga novaeseelandiae). Historically, the timber has been used to construct houses, and used as a substitution for mataī (Prumnopitys taxifolia). The conservation status of P. ferruginea was assessed by the IUCN Red List in 2013 as "Least Concern".

== Description ==
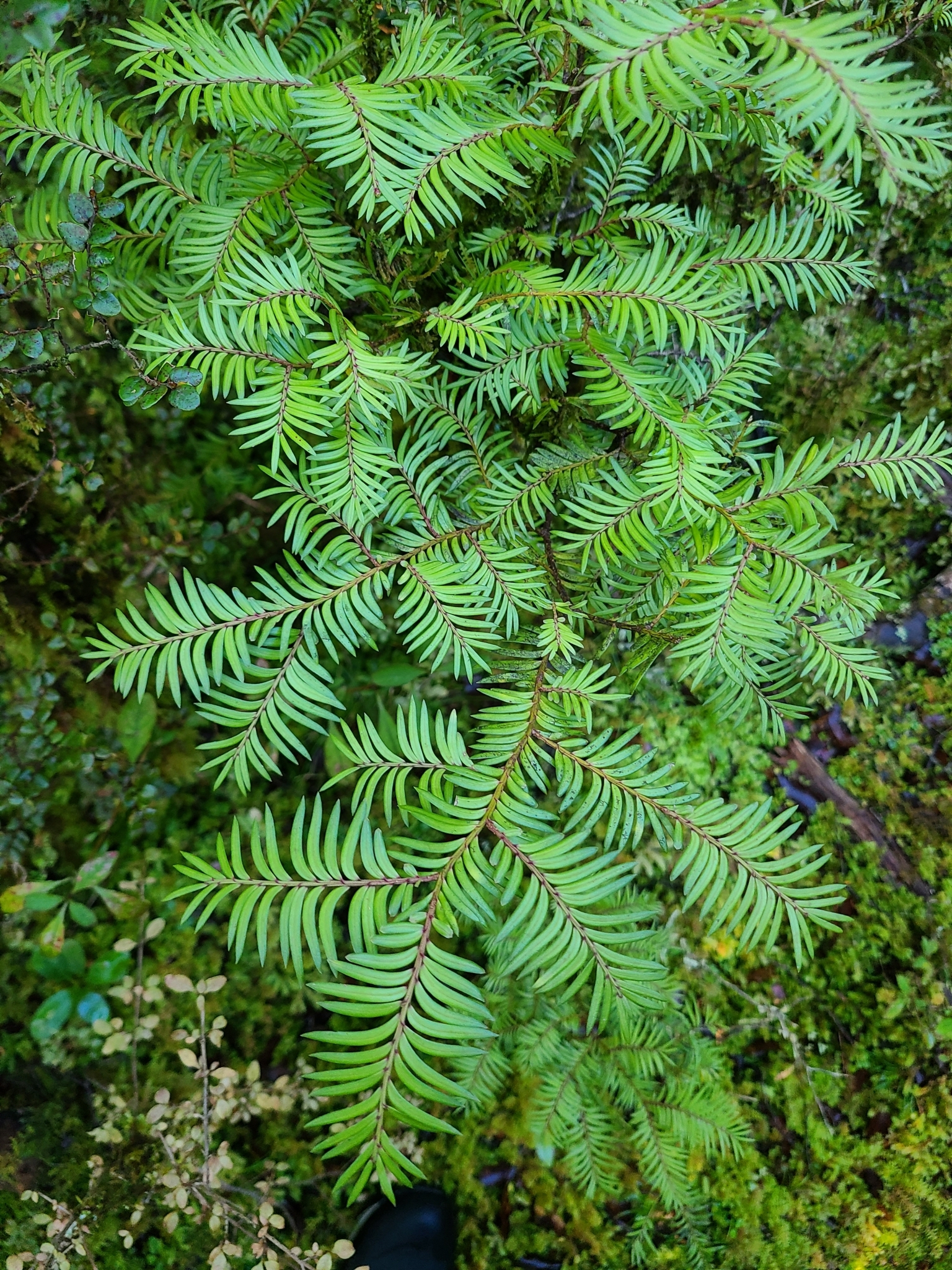
Foliage of P. ferruginea

Pectinopitys ferruginea (miro) is a species of dioecious evergreen conifer in the family Podocarpaceae, reaching heights of up to 25 metres (80 feet), with a smooth and cylindrical trunk up to 1–1.5 metres (3 ft 3 in – 4 ft 11 in) in diameter. P. ferruginea has an estimated lifespan of 250–350 years, although it may live longer than 750 years, it has been suggested about 770 years is the theoretical limit, from specimens examined in Tongariro National Park. P. ferruginea is typically unbranched for a third of its height. Branches are initially ascending and eventually become spreading, forming a domed or rounded crown. Its bark is smooth, and the outer layers naturally peel off over time, becoming furrowed and shredding in thick flakes. Its bark is typically a dark-brown colour, but can be a blackish-grey colour particularly on older trees. The inner bark is purplish in colour, and typically has marks from the separated flakes.

Leaves on young trees are 15–30 mm long and 1.8–2.7 mm wide, and are light-green to brownish-red in colour. On adult trees, the leaves are shorter at about 10–20 mm long and 2–3 mm wide, and are dark green to bronze green in colour. The leaves are distichous in character, meaning they are arranged on two rows on opposite sides of the axis; and are pectinate in character, meaning they are arranged closely together like a comb. The leaves are falcate (sickle-shaped) in character, and curved downwards, tapering at the tip to a point. The midribs are distinct and green in colour, and are especially prominent on the upper surfaces of the leaves. The stomata of the leaves are located in two bands on the underside of the leaves, separated by a midrib.

Like all conifers, P. ferruginea does not produce flowers or fruit, but instead produces pollen and seed in cones. The species is dioecious, with separate male and female trees. The cylindrical pollen cones on male trees are 5–15 mm (20mm) long, 2–3(–4) mm thick, and are axillary and solitary, and found at the tips of the leaves. The ovules (female reproductive structures) on female trees are less than 10 mm long, are found on short branchlets, and are usually solitary or rarely paired. These seed cones are usually found at the ends of lateral stems.

The seed cones take 12–18 months to mature; ripe cones are principally found from November to April. Like most members of Podocarpaceae, the seeds are adapted to avian seed dispersal (ornithochory), with the cone reduced to a single scale, highly modified into a fleshy structure, and containing one or two seeds. They are glaucous, and range in colour from red to pinkish-red, they are oblong to sub-spherical in shape, and are up to 20 mm long. The seeds (or pyrena) are 11–17 mm long, are dark brown to black-brown, and contain a red seed. At maturity, the cones develop a thin layer of wax. The fleshy pulp beneath the skin of the cone is yellow, and is edible, with a taste resembling nutmeg and turpentine.

The bright green foliage and pink to red-coloured cones of P. ferruginea are unlikely to be confused with any other New Zealand conifer. However, young specimens can have a resemblance to yew (Taxus baccata). Although sharing similarities with mataī (Prumnopitys taxifolia), the two species can be distinguished by the purple to black cones and pale bark of P. taxifolia. P. ferruginea has a diploid chromosome count of 36.

=== Phytochemistry ===
The red colour of P. ferruginea seeds derives from cyanidin, which is a common anthocyanin. A 1994 study published in the Journal of Essential Oil Research examined the phytochemicals and leaf oils of P. ferruginea. Researchers found ten sesquiterpene hydrocarbons, seven diterpene compounds, and a rare diterpene alcohol compound in P. ferruginea. A noted example these compounds is ferruginol, a natural terpenoid compound found in P. ferruginea, which has been proven to have antimicrobial and antifungal activity against, Bacillus subtilis and Trichophyton mentagrophytes, respectively. A unique described glycoside, known as 'β-miroside', was first obtained from P. ferruginea leaves in 1995, it is known to exhibit antifungal and cytotoxic activities.

== Gallery ==
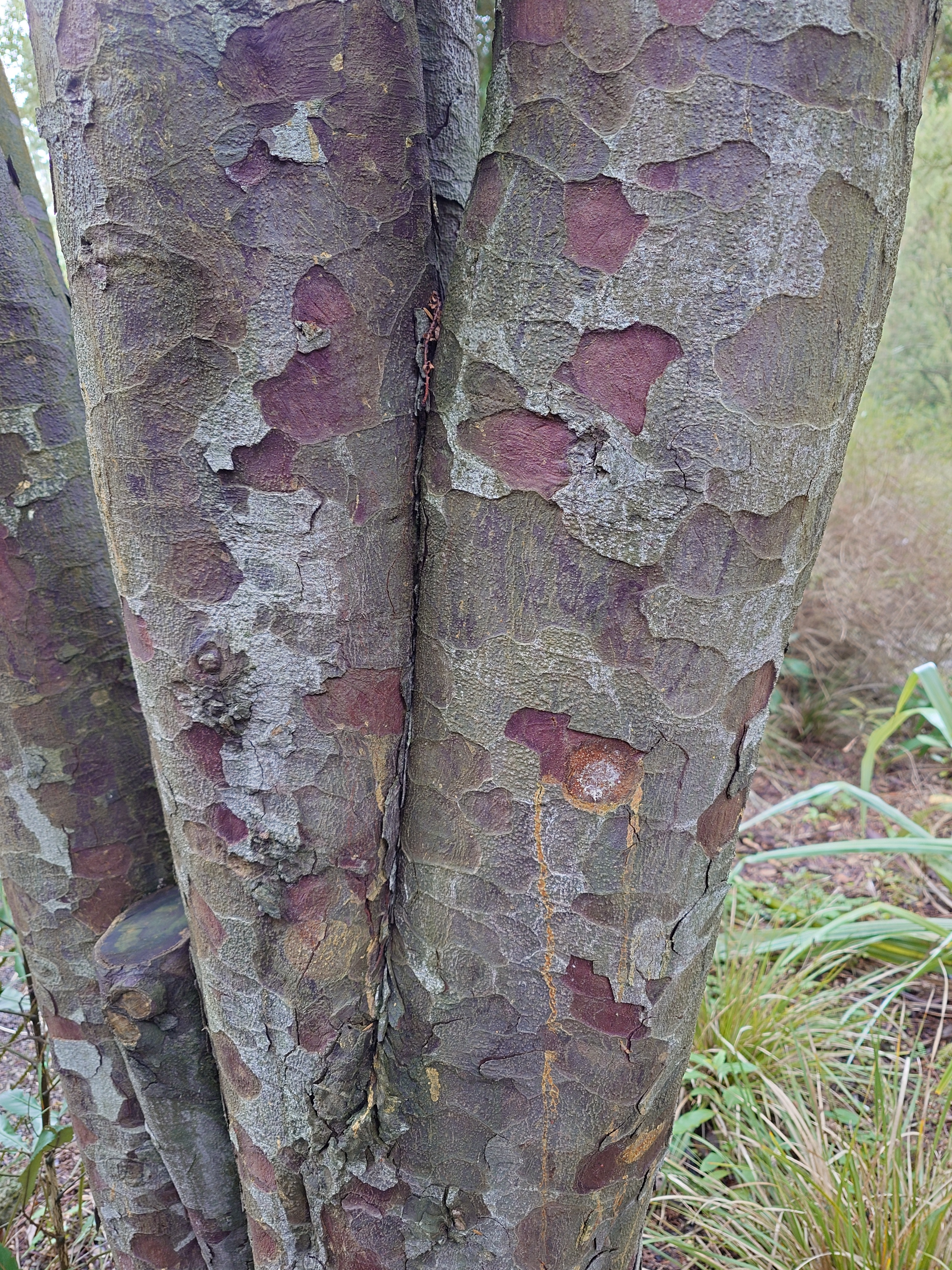
P. ferruginea has smooth bark that is brownish-grey in colour, and the inner bark is purplish in colour.

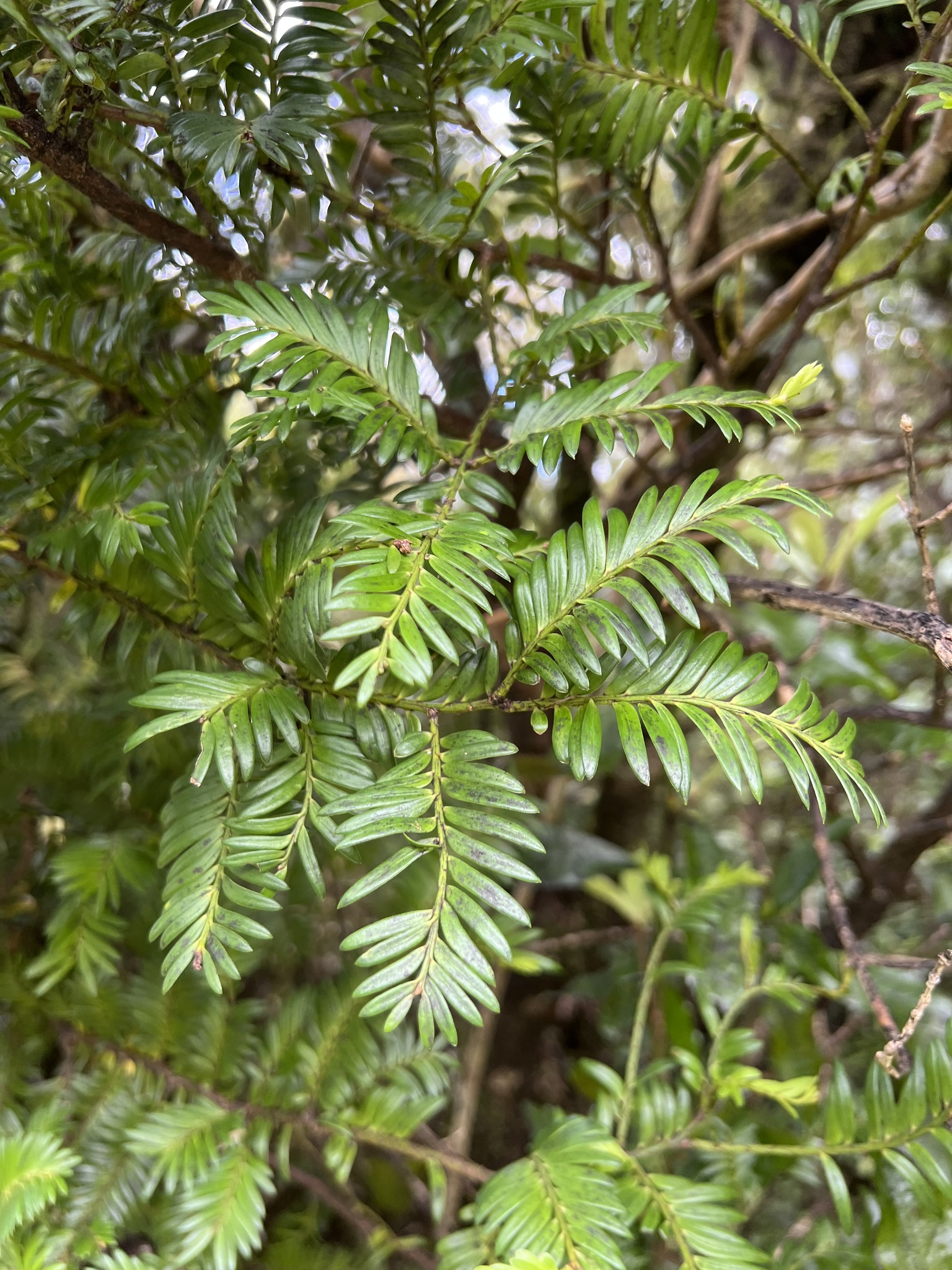
The greenish foliage is arranged in an almost 'comb-like' pattern.

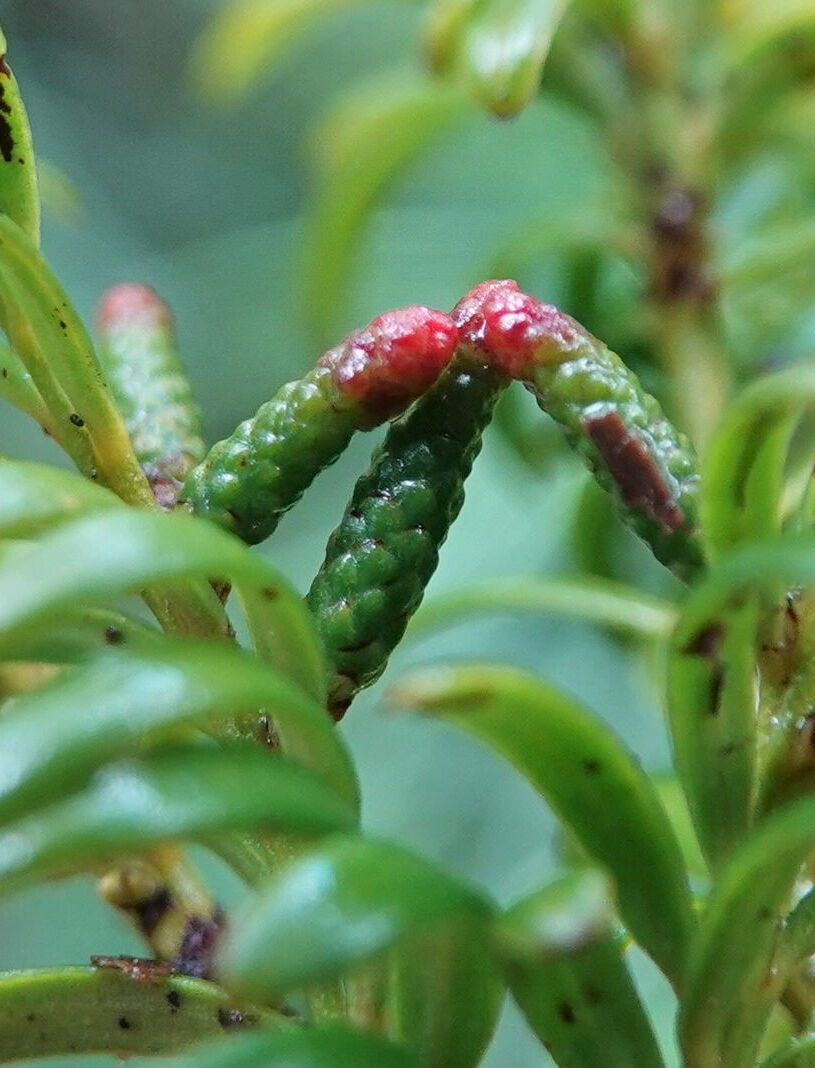
The pollen cones are about 5–15 mm long.

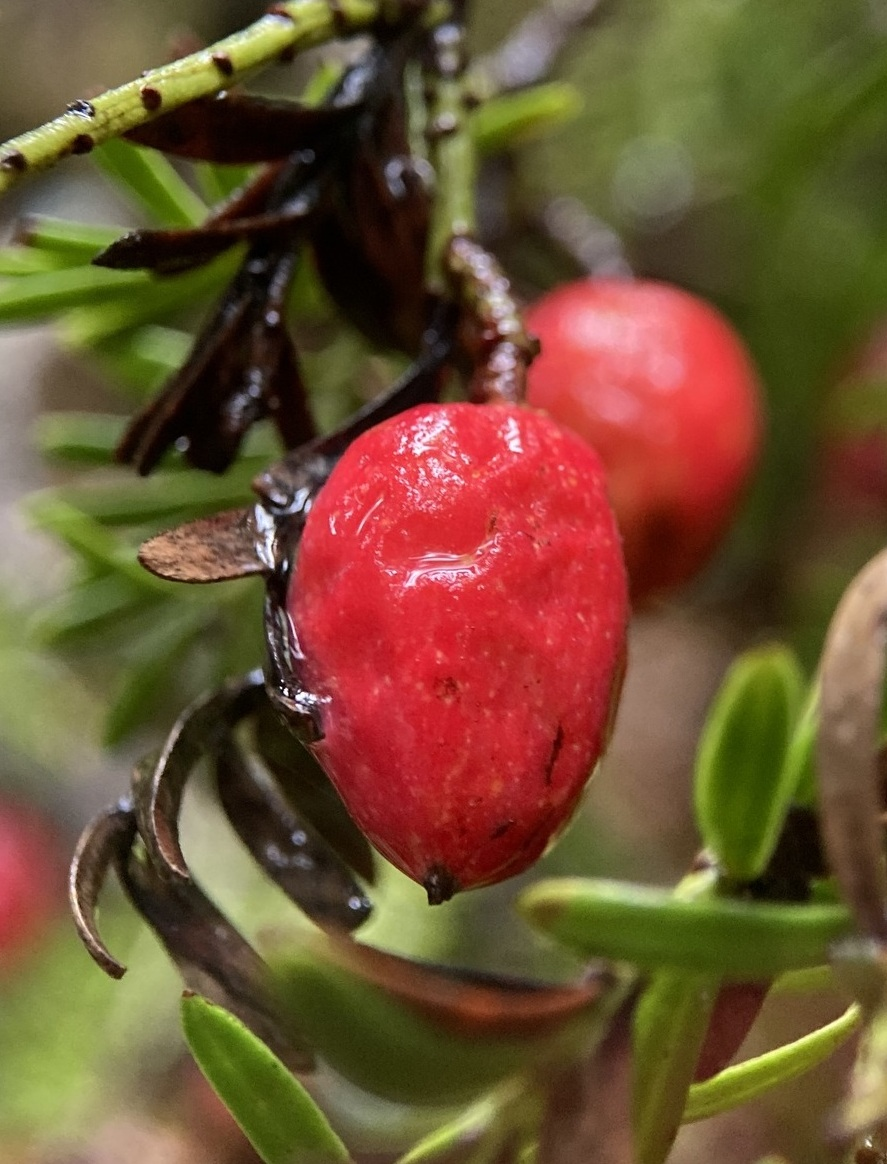
The seed cones are red, sub-spherical, and up to 20 mm long.

== Taxonomy ==
=== Classification ===
- - - Sundacarpus amarus
  - - - Prumnopitys andina
      - - Prumnopitys taxifolia
        - Prumnopitys montana
    - - Pectinopitys ladei
      - - Pectinopitys ferruginea
        - Pectinopitys ferruginoides

Cladogram depicting the relationships of the species within the genera Pectinopitys, Prumnopitys and Sundacarpus.

Pectinopitys ferruginea is categorised in the genus Pectinopitys, which consists of six species across Australasia and South America. Its previous genus, Prumnopitys, consists of five species with a similar distribution range as Pectinopitys. In 2019, British botanist Chris Page transferred six species, including P. ferruginea, from Prumnopitys to a genus Page newly described as Pectinopitys. Page retained three species within the genus Prumnopitys, including the New Zealand mataī (Prumnopitys taxifolia). He based his move on cladistic, morphological, and molecular analysis, concluding that Pectinopitys was distinct enough for it to be described as a new genus, rather than retaining it in Prumnopitys. Page also mentioned that Pectinopitys has a diploid chromosome count of 2n = 36, while Prumnopitys has a count of 2n = 38. A 2012 study based on rbcL data sequencing revealed that Pectinopitys ferruginoides of New Caledonia, is the closest relative to P. ferruginea. Both species are closely related to their former genus Prumnopitys. This is summarised in the cladogram at the right, where both species are categorised in their own subclade.

=== History ===
Pectinopitys ferruginea was first described by British botanist Aylmer Bourke Lambert in 1832 as Podocarpus ferrugineus, which is the basionym (original scientific name) of the species. Lambert did not provide a holotype in his work A Description of the Genus Pinus, the type specimen is hence a syntype. In 1876, the species was transferred by the German botanist Ferdinand von Mueller to the genus Nageia as Nageia ferruginea. In 1891, the French botanist Philippe Édouard Léon Van Tieghem recorded it as Stachycarpus ferrugineus, which cannot be used as the type species of Stachycarpus belongs in Prumnopitys. American botanist David John de Laubenfels described it as Prumnopitys ferruginea in 1978. A study published in the year 2000, attempted to move the species out of the genus Prumnopitys, and renamed it Stachypitys ferruginea, an invalid name as the near-identical name Stachyopitys had been used previously for an unrelated fossil plant. P. ferruginea was designated the type species of the genus Pectinopitys in Page's 2019 revision of the genus.

=== Etymology ===
The etymology (word origin) of the genus name, Pectinopitys, refers to the distinctive arrangement of the species' leaves that are arranged in an 'eyelash-like' or 'comb-like' pattern, which differs in comparison to species within the genus Prumnopitys. The previous genus name, Prumnopitys, means 'plum-fruited pine', which derives from the Greek prunum, which means 'plum', and pitys which means 'pine'. The specific epithet (second part of the scientific name), ferruginea, means 'with the colour of rusted iron', deriving from the Latin ferrum which translates to 'iron', and refers to the young leaves of the species. The species is commonly known as miro and brown pine. The word 'miro' comes from the Proto-Polynesian word 'milo', which is used to describe the unrelated species, Thespesia populnea.

== Ecology ==
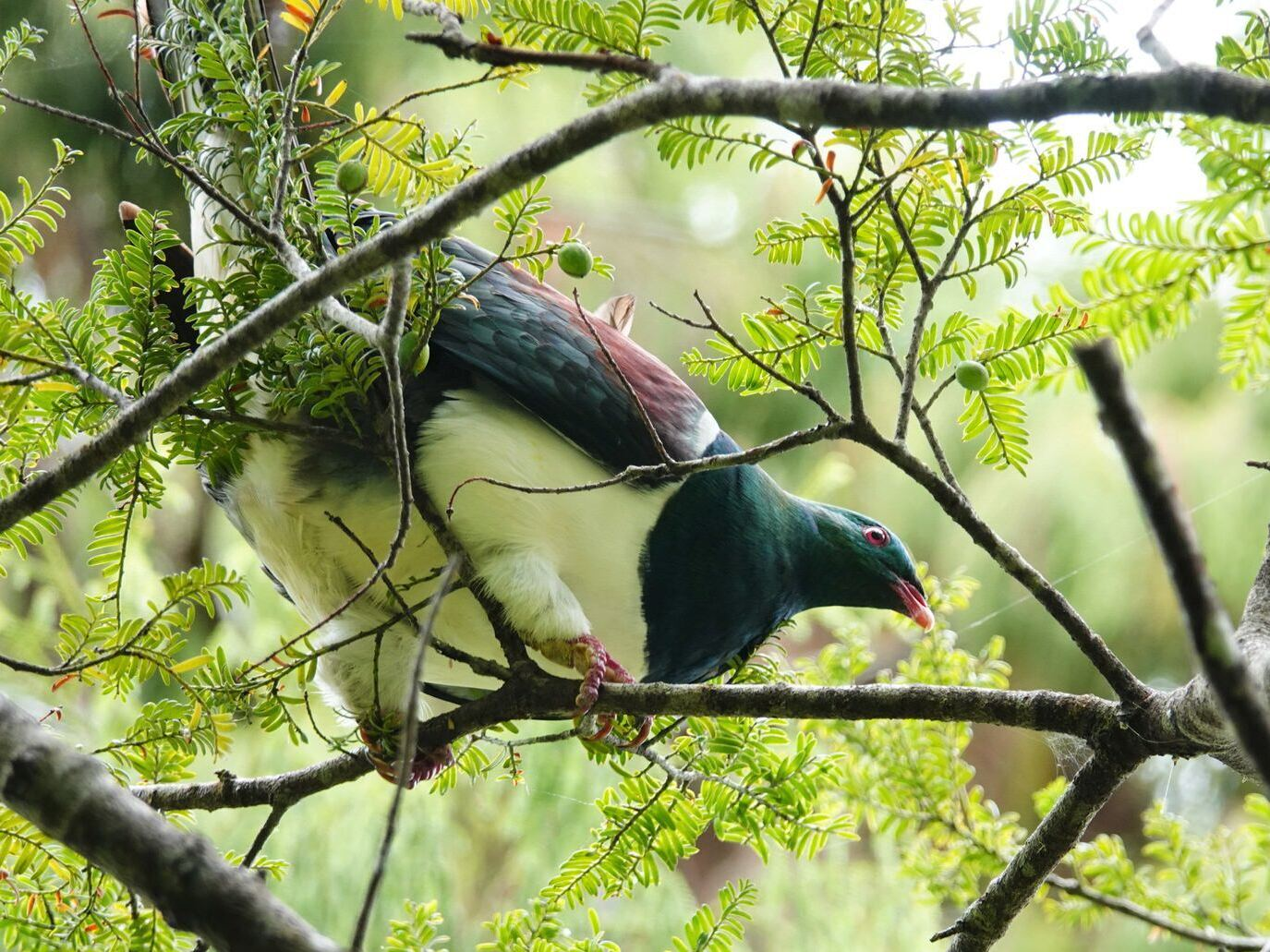
The fleshy cones are a valuable food source for the kererū

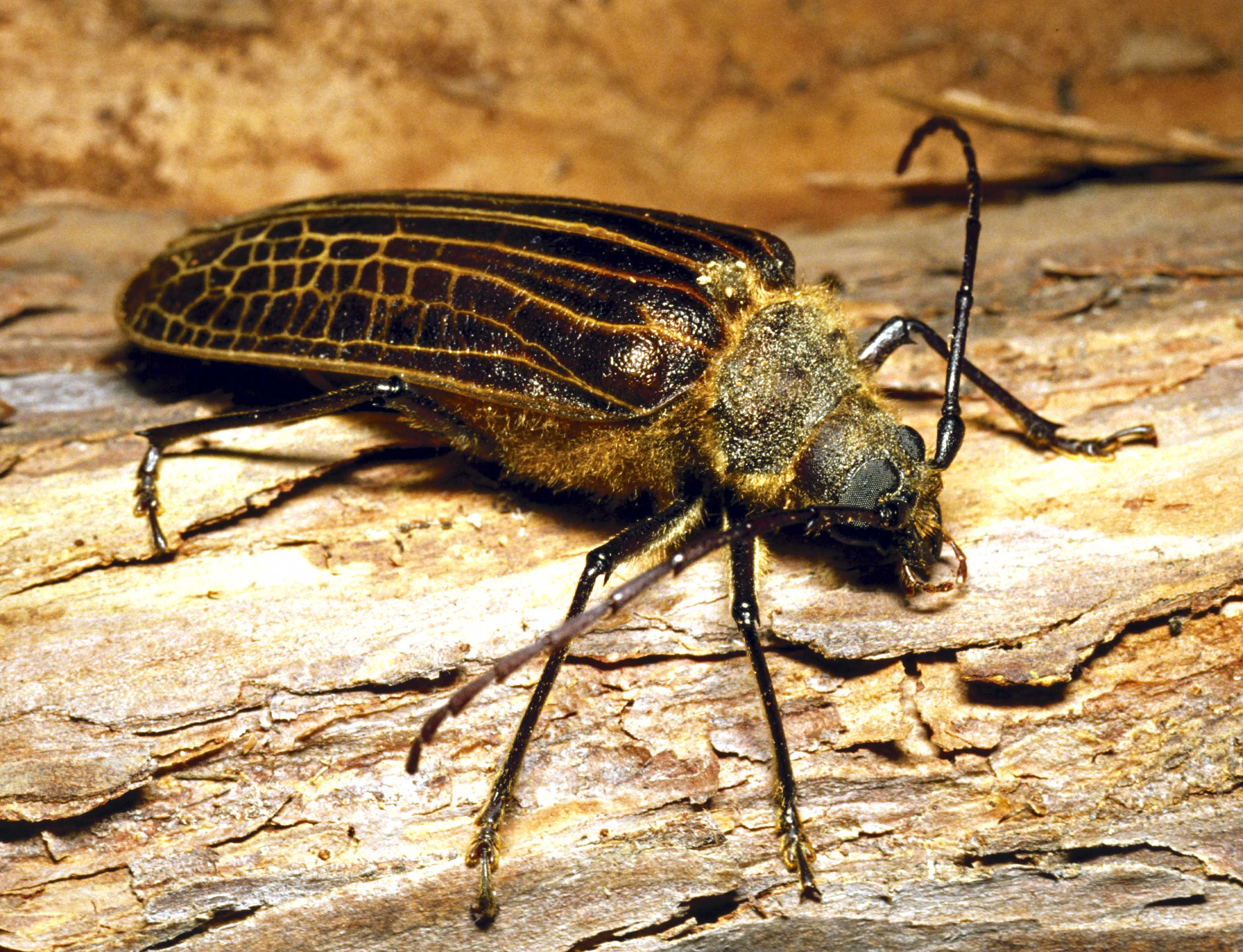
P. ferruginea is a host to the huhu beetle

Pectinopitys ferruginea cones are an important food source for numerous New Zealand native birds, and they are an especially important food source for the kererū (Hemiphaga novaeseelandiae). A 1992 study observed that a single kererū could consume 100 fruits a day, and a single kererū could consume about 10,000 fruits each fruiting season. A single kererū could disperse P. ferruginea seeds up to 10–30 m (30–100 ft) away from a host tree, and in rare cases could be over 1 km (0.6 mi) from a host tree. The kākā (Nestor meridionalis) have been recorded destroying the seeds of P. ferruginea and mataī (Prumnopitys taxifolia). A 1989 study, published in the New Zealand Journal of Ecology, recorded: blackbirds (Turdus merula), brown kiwi (Apteryx australis), kōkako (Callaeas wilsoni), and weka (Gallirallus australis), as dispersers of the fruits of P. ferruginea. A 2021 study hypothesised P. ferruginea cones were consumed by the extinct little bush moa (Anomalopteryx didiformis), although in low quantities when compared to other native species at the studied site at Borland Burn in Fiordland National Park.

Pectinopitys ferruginea is a host to numerous native insects, such as: Ambeodontus tristis, Calliprason sinclairi, and Prionoplus reticularis. The seed-eating moth larvae of Cryptaspasma querula, have been recorded feeding on P. ferruginea seeds. It may take up to two years for P. ferruginea seeds to germinate. The fruits of P. ferruginea reflect some ultraviolet radiation, which is visible to some species of birds and vertebrates, although not as strongly as Dacrycarpus dacrydioides. A. E. Beveridge (1964) estimates that a mature specimen can produce about 32,000 fruits.

Like all conifers, the ovules of P. ferruginea are pollinated by the wind. The cones of P. ferruginea are borne laterally. During pollination, the tip of each cone's central axis grows longer and shifts to a vertical position. Each part of the axis has several thin, non-reproductive bracts (specialised leaves), but typically only the last bract is capable of producing seeds. A pollination drop forms on the slightly swollen cone axis and spreads across its surface, helping to capture pollen efficiently. A 2009 study of the fungal endophytes on various Podocarpaceae species revealed that P. ferruginea had a moderate diversity of endophytes among the studied species; several fungi genera mentioned as hosts on P. ferruginea were: Colletotrichum, Cylindrobasidium, Lasiosphaeria Ophiognomonia, Pezicula, Phomopsis, Phyllosticta, and Xylaria. P. ferruginea has a moderate flammability rate.

== Distribution ==
Pectinopitys ferruginea is endemic to New Zealand; its range mainly covers the North, South, and Stewart Islands. P. ferruginea is widely distributed across New Zealand, but it is more common in the North Island. In the South Island, it occurs principally in the southern parts of the island, further south, on Stewart Island, it is a dominant or co-dominant tree of the forests on the island, commonly associating with Pseudopanax crassifolius. In the Wellington Region, in the North Island, botanist Thomas Kirk noted that P. ferruginea is particularly common on mountain ranges and ridges. P. ferruginea does not naturally occur on the Kermadec and Chatham Islands.

The largest P. ferruginea specimens occur in the central North Island, particularly in deep pumiceous soils. The conservation status of P. ferruginea was assessed by the IUCN Red List in 2013 as "Least Concern", and its population trend was evaluated as "Stable". Its assessment in the New Zealand Threat Classification System was evaluated in 2023 as "Not Threatened".

=== Habitat ===
Pectinopitys ferruginea typically inhabits lowland to montane forests. It occurs from near sea level up to 1,000 m (3,000 ft) above sea level. At certain locations in the South Island, the upper elevational limits of P. ferruginea has risen by more than 60 m (200 ft) past its previous limit, in about the last 150 years, likely due to climate change. P. ferruginea is a slow-growing tree and is highly shade-tolerant, with most young specimens growing in the understories of forests. P. ferruginea grows on similar soils as Dacrydium cupressinum. P. ferruginea typically coincides with other Podocarpaceae species, such as Dacrycarpus dacrydioides and Dacrydium cupressinum. P. ferruginea is commonly found on alluvial soils in the West Coast Region of the South Island.

== Uses ==
[...] the fruit of this pine is about the size of a small plum, rather flattened; it is a bright red externally, with a yellow pulp inside, which covers a large hard stone; the flavour is sweet but rather bitter, very aromatic, resembling that of the nutmeg; it is the favorite food of the Kereru, or wood pigeon.

— Richard Taylor, 1848

Although P. ferruginea had a use as a timber, it was historically considered inferior to mataī (Prumnopitys taxifolia) and tōtara (Podocarpus totara). P. ferruginea wood was used to construct houses, beams, furniture, flooring, and weatherboards. It was often used as a substitution for mataī (Prumnopitys taxifolia). The British missionary, Richard Taylor, described the fruit as "like a plum of a spicy flavour", and an infusion of the bark was used to treat stomach aches. Māori would historically set up "pigeon traps" near P. ferruginea trees to capture kererū. European hunters also learned that kererū are often found feeding on the fruits of the tree, as such, they would often camp near the trees, waiting to capture kererū with their firearms.

The New Zealand missionary, William Colenso, reported to botanist Thomas Kirk that the species is also known as 'toromiro' in the Māori language; Kirk believed this name was primarily used by Māori in the East Cape area. P. ferruginea had several medicinal purposes to Māori. P. ferruginea's cone pulp was used to apply on wounds to stop bleeding. The gum (or sap) is very astringent and was also used as a styptic to stop bleeding from wounds. The bark was infused with water to treat stomach aches and bronchitis. P. ferruginea is uncommon in cultivation, limited to certain botanical gardens in warmer climates.
