= Black pine =

Black pine may refer to:

== Botany ==
- Within the genus Pinus:
  - Pinus nigra, the European black pine or Austrian pine or Corsican pine
  - Pinus thunbergii, the Japanese black pine
  - Pinus jeffreyi, the Jeffrey pine, native to North America
- Within the genus Prumnopitys:
  - Prumnopitys taxifolia, the mataī, a New Zealand conifer
- Within the genus Pectinopitys:
  - Pectinopitys ferruginea, the miro, another New Zealand conifer
  - Pectinopitys ladei, the Mount Spurgeon black pine, native to Australia
- Neorhodomela larix, a species of red algae found in intertidal areas of the North Pacific

== Geography ==
In the United States

- Black Pine, Idaho, a ghost town
- Black Pine Mountains, a mountain range

== Music ==
- The band The Black Pine
