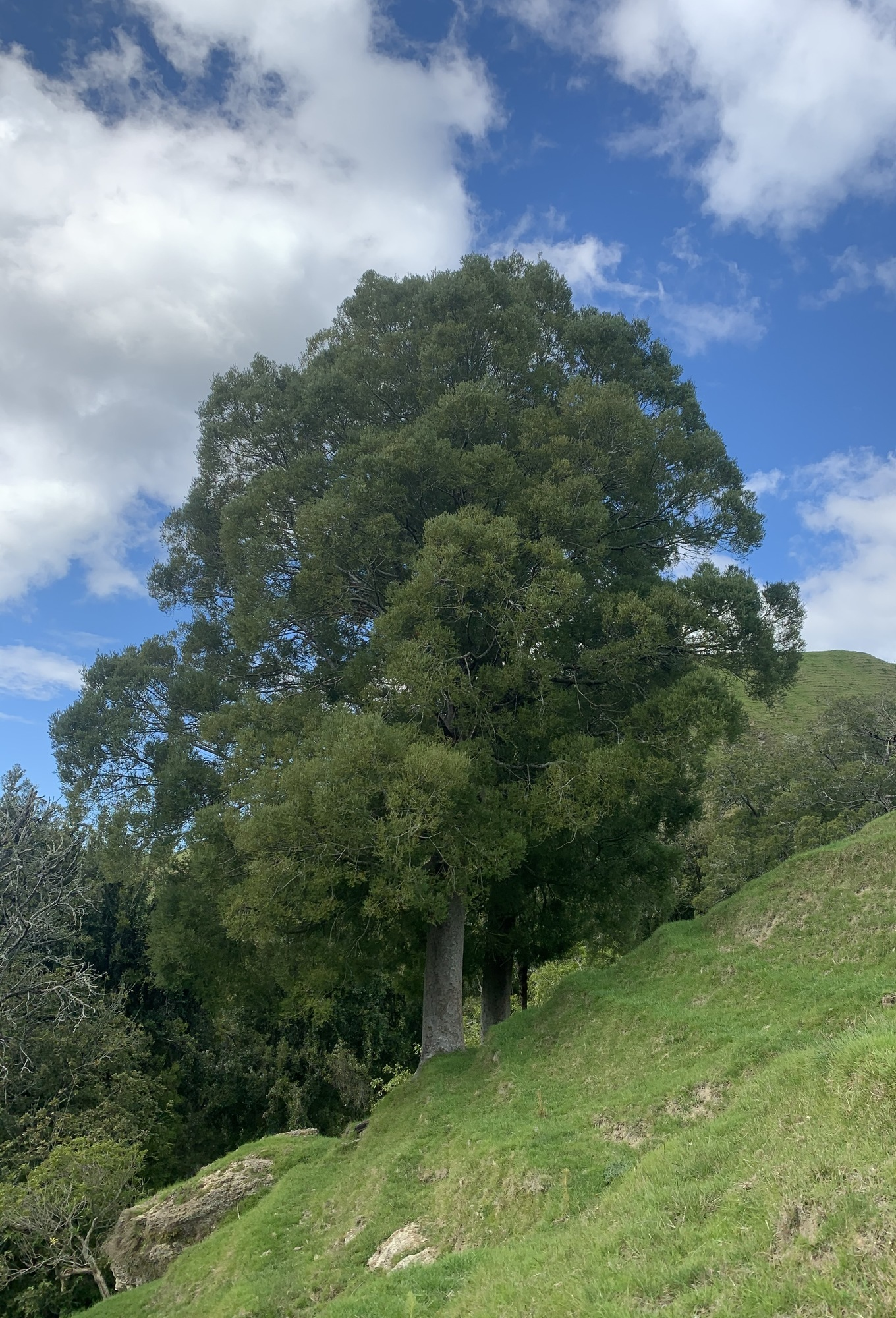
- Prumnopitys taxifolia

Scientific classification
- Kingdom: Plantae
- Clade: Tracheophytes
- Clade: Gymnosperms
- Division: Pinophyta
- Class: Pinopsida
- Order: Araucariales
- Family: Podocarpaceae
- Genus: Prumnopitys; Phil.

Type species
- Prumnopitys elegans Phil.

Species
- Prumnopitys andina (Poepp. ex Endl.) de Laub.; Prumnopitys montana (Humb. & Bonpl. ex Willd.) de Laub.; Prumnopitys taxifolia (Sol. ex D.Don) de Laub.

Synonyms
- Botryopitys Doweld; Stachycarpus Tiegh.; Van-tieghemia A.V.Bobrov & Melikian, nom. illeg.

= Prumnopitys =

Genus of conifers

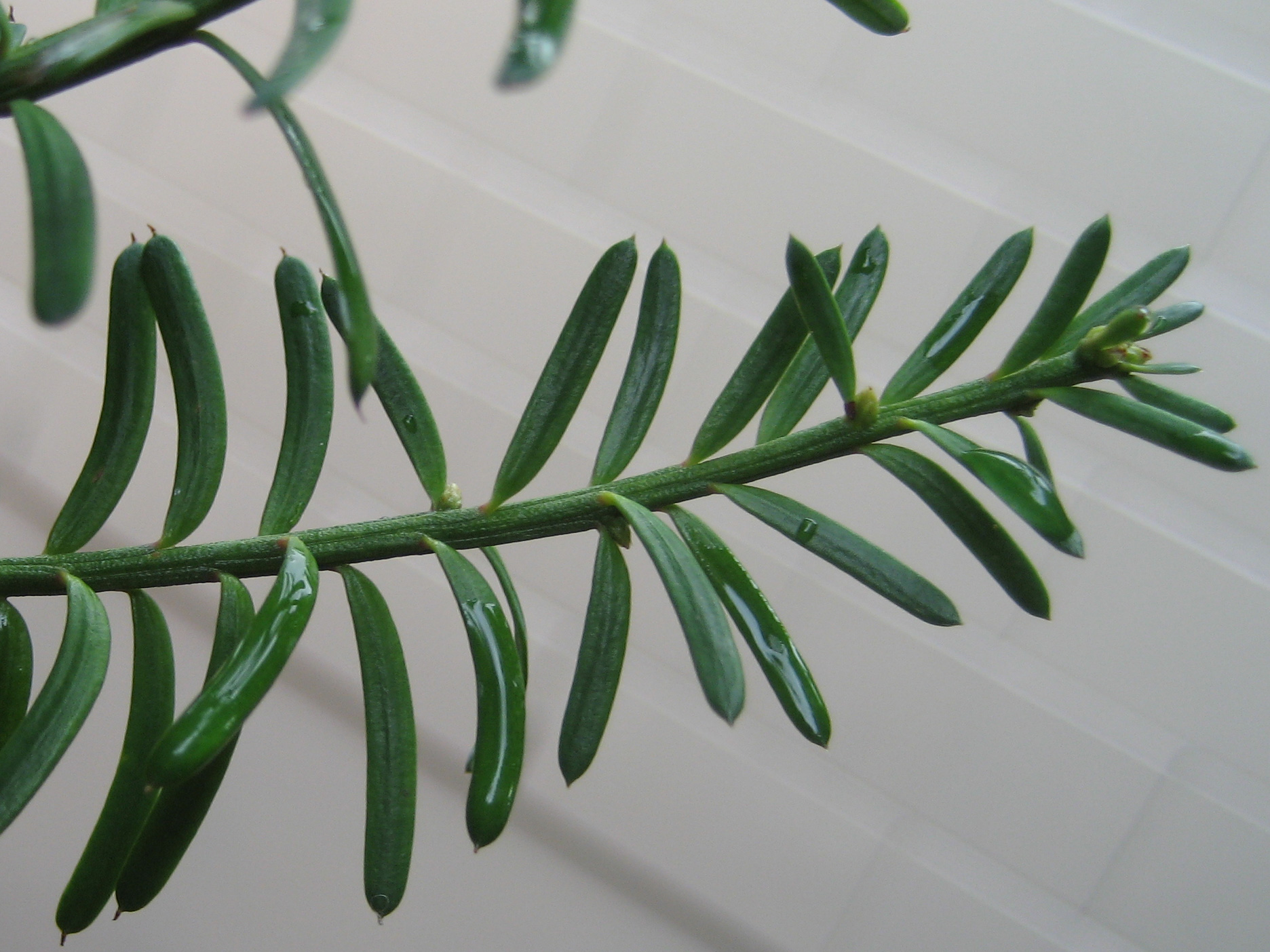
Adult leaves of P. taxifolia

Prumnopitys is a genus of conifers in the family Podocarpaceae. It includes three species of densely branched, dioecious trees up to 40 metres in height, native to South America and New Zealand.

== Etymology ==
The name Prumnopitys comes from the Ancient Greek prymnos (πρυμνός ‘hindmost’) and pitys (πίτυς ‘pine’), referring to the resin duct being behind the midrib.

== Description ==
The leaves are similar to those of the yew, strap-shaped, 1–4 cm long and 2–3 mm broad, with a soft texture; they are green above, and with two blue-green stomatal bands below. The seed cones are highly modified, reduced to a central stem 1–5 cm long bearing several scales; one to five scales are fertile, each bearing a single seed surrounded by fleshy scale tissue, resembling a drupe. These berry-like cone scales are eaten by birds which then disperse the seeds in their droppings.

== Distribution ==
The species are distributed on both sides of the Pacific, in New Zealand and along the mountain ranges of western South America from Chile to Venezuela. This distribution indicates the origins of Prumnopitys in the Antarctic flora, which evolved from the humid temperate flora of southern Gondwana, an ancient supercontinent.

== Species ==
As of June 2025, Plants of the World Online accepts the following three species:

- Prumnopitys andina (Poepp. ex Endl.) de Laub. – south-central and southern Chile and southern Argentina
- Prumnopitys montana (Humb. & Bonpl. ex Willd.) de Laub. – northwestern Venezuela, Colombia, Ecuador, and northern Peru
- Prumnopitys taxifolia (Sol. ex D.Don) de Laub. – New Zealand

=== Formerly placed here ===
Six species formerly in Prumnopitys were placed in the new genus Pectinopitys in 2019, and many sources still include them in Prumnopitys.

- Pectinopitys exigua (de Laub.) C.N.Page (as Prumnopitys exigua de Laub.)
- Pectinopitys ferruginea (G.Benn. ex D.Don) C.N.Page (as Prumnopitys ferruginea (G.Benn. ex D.Don) de Laub.)
- Pectinopitys ferruginoides (Compton) C.N.Page (as Prumnopitys ferruginoides (Compton) de Laub.)
- Pectinopitys harmsiana (Pilg.) C.N.Page (as Prumnopitys harmsiana (Pilg.) de Laub.)
- Pectinopitys ladei (F.M.Bailey) C.N.Page (as Prumnopitys ladei (F.M.Bailey) de Laub.)
- Pectinopitys standleyi (J.Buchholz & N.E.Gray) C.N.Page (as Prumnopitys standleyi (J.Buchholz & N.E.Gray) de Laub.)

== Fossil record ==
Fossils of Prumnopitys have been described from the Eocene of Australia, including Prumnopitys tasmanica (Townrow) Greenwood, Prumnopitys lanceolata Greenwood, and Prumnopitys portensis Pole.

== Taxonomy ==
Although the genus Prumnopitys was first described in 1861, it was only from 1978 that it was widely distinguished as distinct from the allied genus Podocarpus, despite the marked differences in cone development with different parts of the cone structure becoming fleshy and berry-like. Many older texts still have the species listed under Podocarpus.

In 2019 Christopher N. Page split six species into the new genus Pectinopitys based on morphological and molecular phylogenetic evidence. Page found that Prumnopitys and Pectinopitys are most closely related to Sundacarpus.

Several species of Prumnopitys are used for timber, though as they are slow-growing, supplies are very limited and over-cutting has led to some having an unfavourable conservation status.

Phylogeny of Prumnopitys

- - P. taxifolia (Solander ex Don) de Laubenfels (Matai)
  - - P. montana (von Humboldt & Bonpland ex Willdenow) de Laubenfels
    - - P. harmsiana (Pilger) de Laubenfels (Romerillo hembra)
      - - P. andina (Poeppig ex Endlicher) de Laubenfels (Plum-fruited yew; Lleuque)
        - P. exigua de Laubenfels (Pino castilla)
