= 黑松 =

黑松 or 黒松, meaning "black pine", may refer to:

- HeySong Corporation, beverage producer in Taiwan
- Kuromatsu Station, several train stations
