= Podocarpus spicatus =

Podocarpus spicatus can refer to:

- Podocarpus spicatus Poepp., a synonym of Prumnopitys andina (Poepp. ex Endl.) de Laub.
- Podocarpus spicatus R.Br., a synonym of Prumnopitys taxifolia (Sol. ex D.Don) de Laub.
