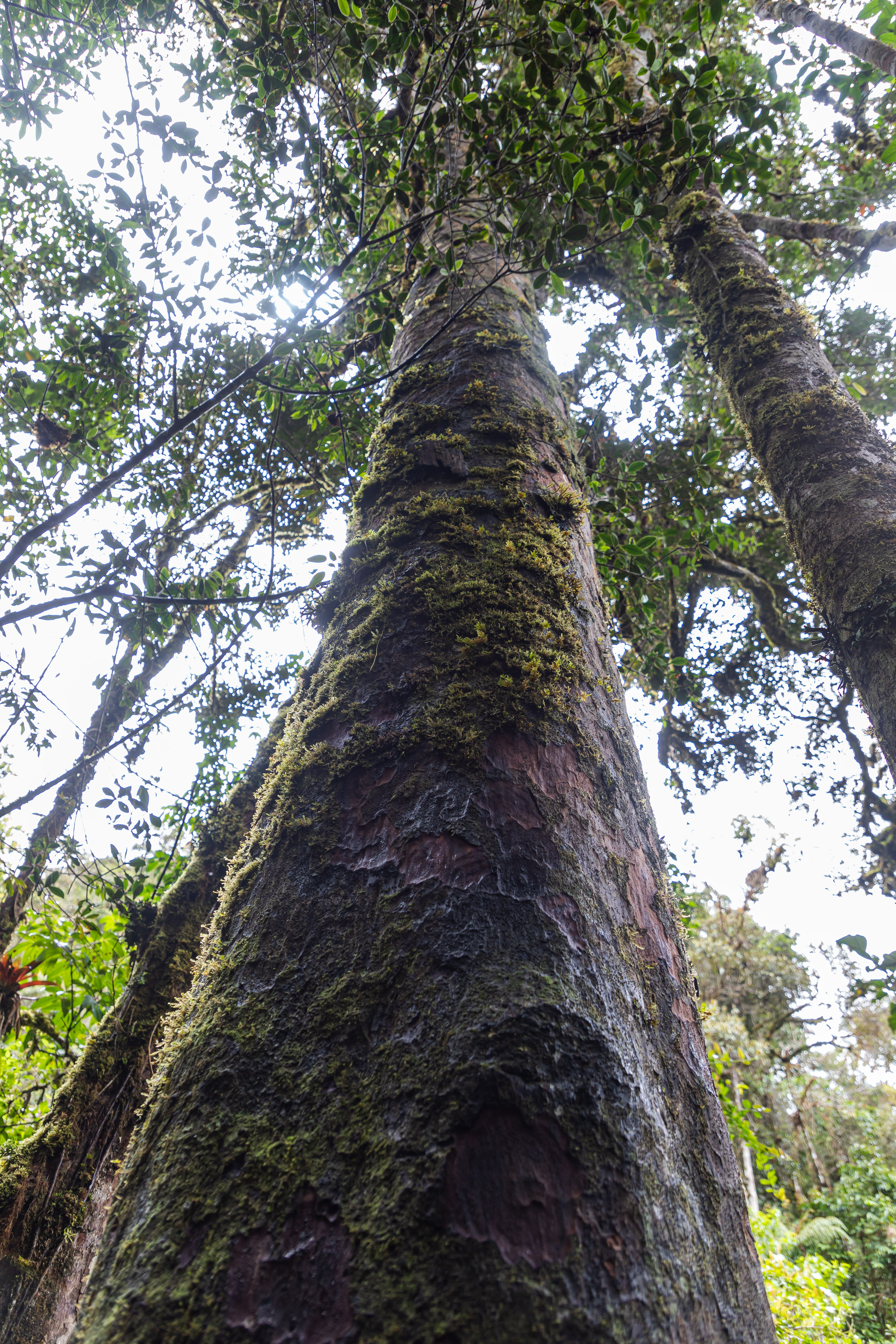
- In Yanachaga Chemillén National Park

Conservation status
- Near Threatened (IUCN 3.1)

Scientific classification
- Kingdom: Plantae
- Clade: Embryophytes
- Clade: Tracheophytes
- Clade: Spermatophytes
- Clade: Gymnospermae
- Division: Pinophyta
- Class: Pinopsida
- Order: Araucariales
- Family: Podocarpaceae
- Genus: Pectinopitys
- Species: P. harmsiana

Binomial name
- Pectinopitys harmsiana (Pilg.) C.N.Page

Synonyms
- Podocarpus harmsianus Pilg.; Prumnopitys harmsiana (Pilg.) de Laub.; Stachycarpus harmsianus (Pilg.) Gaussen; Podocarpus utilior Pilg.; Prumnopitys utilior (Pilg.) Melikyan & A.V.Bobrov; Stachycarpus utilior (Pilg.) Gaussen

= Pectinopitys harmsiana =

Species of conifer

Pectinopitys harmsiana, known as uncumanu amongst a number of other names, is a species of conifer native to the Andes in Bolivia, Colombia, Peru, and Venezuela. It is in the family Podocarpaceae, and has been assessed as near Threatened by the IUCN.

== Description ==
Pectinopitys harmsiana is a medium-sized tree similar to Prumnopitys andina. The leaves are 2–3 cm long and 2–3 mm broad, with a short spiny tip. The cones are highly modified, bearing a few drupe-like seeds, each seed with a thin fleshy coat.

== Conservation ==
The species is threatened by clearing for agriculture and logging (the wood is valued highly in construction and marketed as 'romerillo').
