= Podocarpus rusbyi =

Conservation status
- Vulnerable (IUCN 3.1)

Scientific classification
- Kingdom: Plantae
- Clade: Tracheophytes
- Clade: Gymnosperms
- Division: Pinophyta
- Class: Pinopsida
- Order: Araucariales
- Family: Podocarpaceae
- Genus: Podocarpus
- Species: P. rusbyi

Binomial name
- Podocarpus rusbyi J.Buchholz & N.E.Gray

Species of conifer

Podocarpus rusbyi is a species of conifer in the family Podocarpaceae. It is a tree native to Bolivia and central Peru. In Peru it grows in lower montane rainforest near Cusco from 700 to 1,300 metres elevation, and in upper montane rain forest near Machu Picchu at 2,900 metres. It is more common and widespread in Bolivia, where it grows in montane rain forest from 1500 to 3,350 metres elevation. At high elevations it forms thickets with other stunted trees and shrubs. In Madidi National Park Podocarpus rusbyi is associated with Weinmannia fagaroides, W. microphylla, W. bangii, Myrsine coriacea, Palicourea tristis, and species of Clusia, Miconia, Persea, Ternstroemia, Freziera, and Symplocos.

The species was described by John Theodore Buchholz and Netta Elizabeth Gray in 1948.
