= Pectinopitys standleyi =

Conservation status
- Endangered (IUCN 3.1)

Scientific classification
- Kingdom: Plantae
- Clade: Tracheophytes
- Clade: Gymnospermae
- Division: Pinophyta
- Class: Pinopsida
- Order: Araucariales
- Family: Podocarpaceae
- Genus: Pectinopitys
- Species: P. standleyi

Binomial name
- Pectinopitys standleyi (J.Buchholz & N.E.Gray) C.N.Page

Synonyms
- Podocarpus standleyi J.Buchholz & N.E.Gray; Prumnopitys standleyi (J.Buchholz & N.E.Gray) de Laub.; Stachycarpus standleyi (J.Buchholz & N.E.Gray) Gaussen

Species of conifer

Pectinopitys standleyi, commonly called cipresillo, is a species of conifer in the family Podocarpaceae. It grows up to 25 m (82 ft) in height, and is found mostly between 2,000 and 2,600 m (6,600 and 8,500 ft) altitude. It is found only in Costa Rica.
