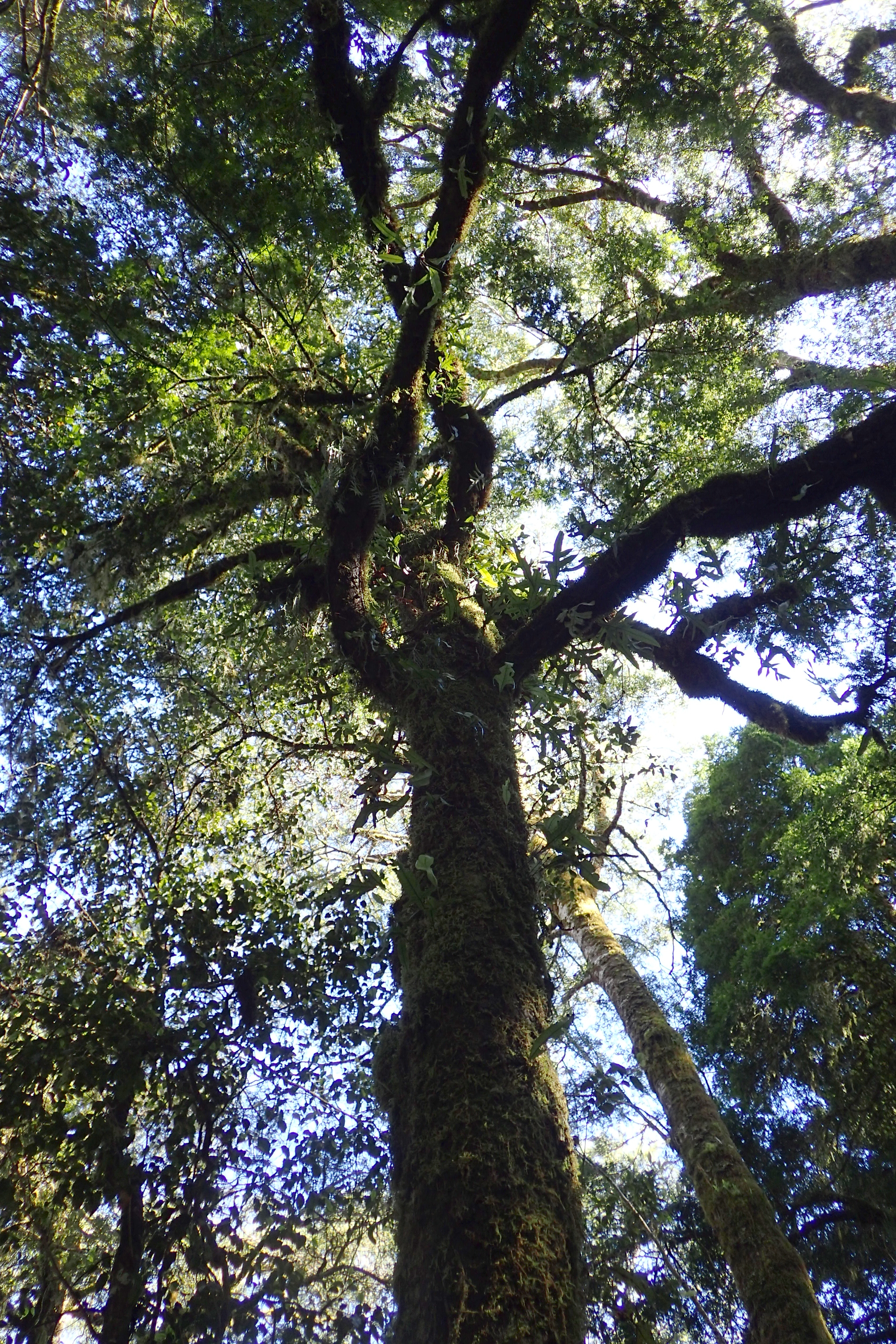
- Pectinopitys ferruginea

Scientific classification
- Kingdom: Plantae
- Clade: Tracheophytes
- Clade: Gymnospermae
- Division: Pinophyta
- Class: Pinopsida
- Order: Araucariales
- Family: Podocarpaceae
- Genus: Pectinopitys; C.N.Page

Type species
- Pectinopitys ferruginea (G.Benn. ex D.Don) C.N.Page

Synonyms
- Stachypitys A.V.Bobrov & Melikyan

= Pectinopitys =

Genus of conifers

Pectinopitys is a small genus of conifers from South America and Australasia belonging to the podocarp family, Podocarpaceae. It was split out from the Prumnopitys complex by British botanist Chris Page in 2019. It is still considered as closely allied to this genus and Sundacarpus.

== Species ==
- Pectinopitys exigua (de Laub.) C.N.Page – Bolivia
- Pectinopitys ferruginea (G.Benn. ex D.Don) C.N.Page – New Zealand
- Pectinopitys ferruginoides (Compton) C.N.Page – New Caledonia
- Pectinopitys harmsiana (Pilg.) C.N.Page – South America
- Pectinopitys ladei (F.M.Bailey) C.N.Page – Queensland, Australia
- Pectinopitys standleyi (J.Buchholz & N.E.Gray) C.N.Page – Costa Rica
