= Prumnopitys exigua =

Conservation status
- Near Threatened (IUCN 3.1)

Scientific classification
- Kingdom: Plantae
- Clade: Tracheophytes
- Clade: Gymnospermae
- Division: Pinophyta
- Class: Pinopsida
- Order: Araucariales
- Family: Podocarpaceae
- Genus: Prumnopitys
- Species: P. exigua

Binomial name
- Prumnopitys exigua de Laub.

Species of conifer

Prumnopitys exigua is a species of conifer in the family Podocarpaceae. It is endemic to Bolivia.

Trees grow to 20 m tall and 100 cm in diameter, with a short stout bole and spreading branches forming a rounded crown. Bark is first smooth, later exfoliating in irregular papery strips; reddish brown, weathering darker. Leaves are alternate, petiolate, twisted at base; color yellow-green at flush, turning lustrous dark green above and dull light green below. Pollen cones on lateral and axillary spikes near branch tips, each spike bearing up to 20 spreading cones, each axillary to a small leaf, 7–10 × 2 mm. Seed cones solitary on 10–15 mm long twigs, green ripening yellow, consisting of an epimatium covering a globose seed that at maturity is pruinose, 10–12 mm diameter, with an apical crest.

The epithet is from the Latin exiguus, "short"; it was at first thought to be a dwarfed plant, but larger specimens were later identified.
