= MycoKeys =

Peer-reviewed scientific journal

- Discipline: Systematics, Mycology
- Language: English

Publication details
- History: 2011–present
- Publisher: Pensoft Publishers
- Frequency: Upon acceptance
- Open access: Yes
- License: Creative Commons Attribution 4.0
- Impact factor: 4.1 (2025)

Standard abbreviations
- ISO 4: MycoKeys

Indexing
- ISSN: 1314-4057

Links
- Journal homepage; Online access

MycoKeys is a peer-reviewed open access scientific journal covering mycology. It was established in 2011 by Pensoft Publishers. The editor-in-chief is H. Thorsten Lumbsch.

== Abstracting and indexing ==
The journal is abstracted and indexed in:

- Science Citation Index Expanded
- Current Contents/Agriculture, Biology & Environmental Sciences
- BIOSIS Previews

According to the Journal Citation Reports, the journal has a 2024 impact factor of 3.6.
