= Kuromatsu Station =

Kuromatsu Station may refer to either of two train stations in Japan:

- Kuromatsu Station (Miyagi) (黒松駅), in Sendai, Miyagi Prefecture
- Kuromatsu Station (Shimane) (黒松駅), in Shimane Prefecture
