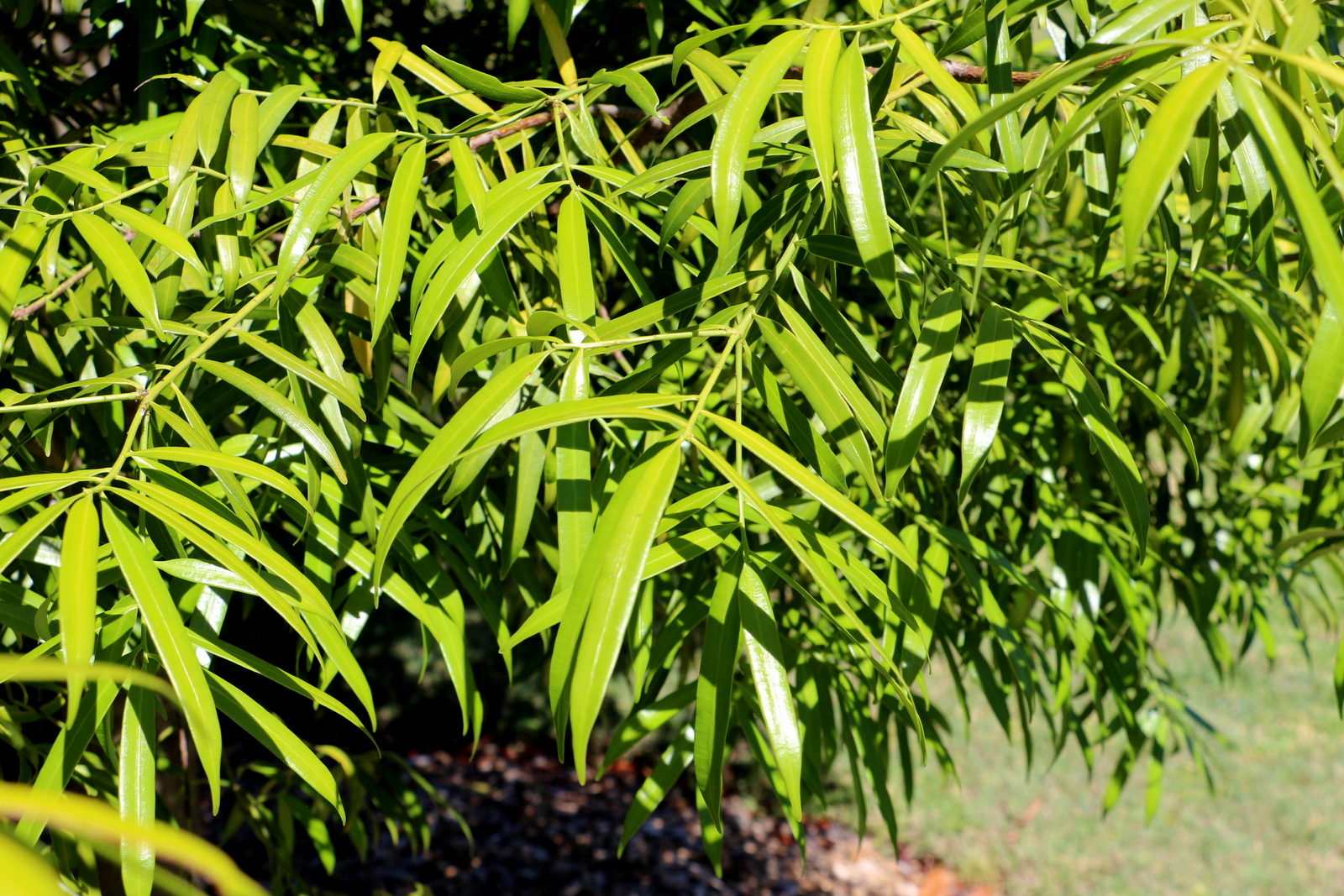
- Royal Botanic Gardens Sydney

Conservation status
- Least Concern (IUCN 3.1)

Scientific classification
- Kingdom: Plantae
- Clade: Tracheophytes
- Clade: Gymnosperms
- Division: Pinophyta
- Class: Pinopsida
- Order: Araucariales
- Family: Podocarpaceae
- Genus: Sundacarpus (J.Buchholz & N.E.Gray) C.N.Page
- Species: S. amarus

Binomial name
- Sundacarpus amarus (Blume) C.N.Page

Synonyms
- 8 synonyms: Nageia amara (Blume) F.Muell.; Podocarpus amara Blume; Prumnopitys amara (Blume) de Laub.; Stachycarpus amarus (Blume) Gaussen; Nageia eurhyncha (Miq.) Kuntze; Podocarpus dulcamara Seem.; Podocarpus eurhyncha Miq.; Podocarpus pedunculatus F.M.Bailey

= Sundacarpus =

Single-species genus of conifers

Sundacarpus is a monotypic genus of conifer in the family Podocarpaceae. It was established by Christopher Nigel Page in 1989 and contains a single species – Sundacarpus amarus – which had formerly been classified variously as a species of Podocarpus or of Prumnopitys. In Australia it is treated as Prumnopitys amara (Blume) de Laub.

== Description ==
Sundacarpus amarus is a large evergreen tree, 10–60 m (33–197 ft) in height, with a trunk from 12–140 cm (4.7–55.1 in) in diameter. The leaves are 5–15 cm (2.0–5.9 in) long and narrow.

== Distribution and habitat ==
Sundacarpus amarus is native to parts of Australia and Malesia. In Australia, the genus is found only in Queensland, primarily on the Atherton Tableland and adjacent parts of northeastern coastal Queensland. It is quite common in New Guinea, New Britain, and New Ireland, where it is often found in montane forests together with southern beech (Nothofagus). Sundacarpus amarus is also found on the Indonesian islands of Buru, Halmahera, Morotai, Sulawesi, Lombok, Flores, Timor, Sumbawa, Java, Sumatra, in Sabah province on the island of Borneo and on Mindanao and Luzon in the Philippines.
