= Pectinopitys ferruginoides =

Conservation status
- Least Concern (IUCN 3.1)

Scientific classification
- Kingdom: Plantae
- Clade: Tracheophytes
- Clade: Gymnospermae
- Division: Pinophyta
- Class: Pinopsida
- Order: Araucariales
- Family: Podocarpaceae
- Genus: Pectinopitys
- Species: P. ferruginoides

Binomial name
- Pectinopitys ferruginoides (Compton) C.N.Page (2019)

Synonyms
- Podocarpus distichus J.Buchholz (1951); Podocarpus distichus var. maialis J.Buchholz (1951); Podocarpus ferruginoides Compton (1922); Prumnopitys ferruginoides (Compton) de Laub. (1972); Stachycarpus distichus (J.Buchholz) Gaussen (1974), without basionym ref.; Stachycarpus ferruginoides (Compton) Gaussen (1974), without basionym ref.; Stachypitys disticha (J.Buchholz) A.V.Bobrov & Melikyan (2000); Stachypitys ferruginoides (Compton) A.V.Bobrov & Melikyan (2000)

Species of conifer

Pectinopitys ferruginoides is a species of conifer in the family Podocarpaceae. It is a tree endemic to New Caledonia.

It is widespread on Grande Terre, New Caledonia's largest island, and is more common in the south. It grows in humid dense montane rainforest, generally on ultramafic substrates, from 700 to 1,400 metres elevation, and occasionally as low as 200 m. It often coincides with Retrophyllum comptonii.
