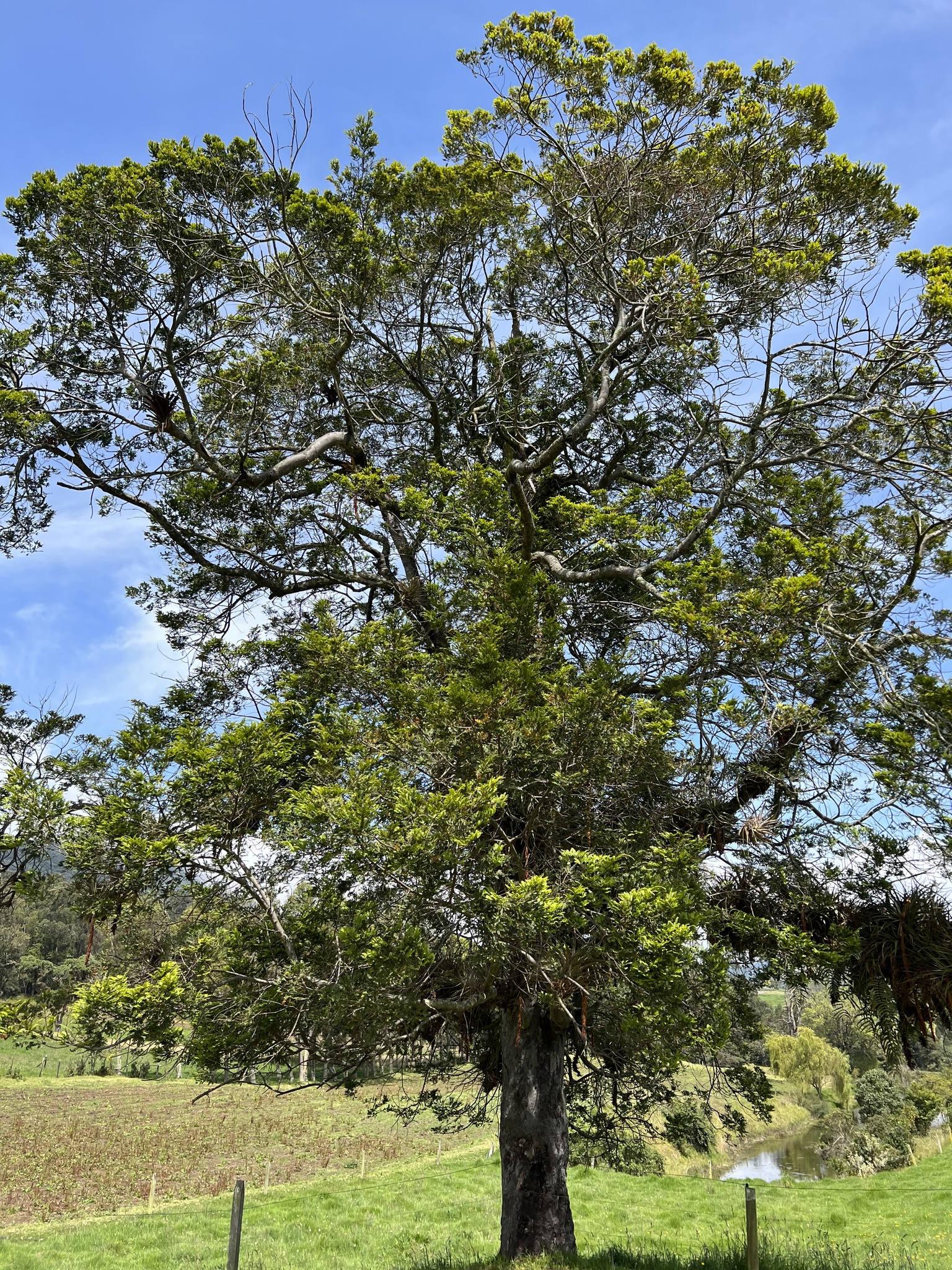

Conservation status
- Vulnerable (IUCN 3.1)

Scientific classification
- Kingdom: Plantae
- Clade: Tracheophytes
- Clade: Gymnosperms
- Division: Pinophyta
- Class: Pinopsida
- Order: Araucariales
- Family: Podocarpaceae
- Genus: Prumnopitys
- Species: P. montana

Binomial name
- Prumnopitys montana (Humb. & Bonpl. ex Willd.) de Laub.

Synonyms
- Synonymy: Botryopitys densifolia (Kunth) Doweld; Botryopitys meridensis (J.Buchholz & N.E.Gray) Doweld; Botryopitys montana (Humb. & Bonpl. ex Willd.) Doweld; Dacrydium distichum D.Don; Nageia curvifolia (Carrière) Kuntze; Nageia montana (Humb. & Bonpl. ex Willd.) Kuntze; Podocarpus antarcticus Carrière, not validly publ.; Podocarpus curvifolius Carrière; Podocarpus humboldtii Gordon & Glend., not validly publ.; Podocarpus montanus (Humb. & Bonpl. ex Willd.) Lodd. ex Endl.; Podocarpus montanus var. densifolius J.Buchholz & N.E.Gray; Podocarpus montanus var. diversifolius Dallim. & A.B.Jacks.; Podocarpus montanus var. meridensis J.Buchholz & N.E.Gray; Podocarpus taxifolius Kunth; Podocarpus taxifolius var. communis Kunth, not validly publ.; Podocarpus taxifolius var. densifolius Kunth; Prumnopitys montana var. densifolia (Kunth) C.N.Page; Prumnopitys montana var. diversifolia (Dallim. & A.B.Jacks.) C.N.Page; Prumnopitys montana var. meridensis (J.Buchholz & N.E.Gray) C.N.Page; Stachycarpus meridensis (J.Buchholz & N.E.Gray) Gaussen, without basionym ref.; Stachycarpus montanus (Humb. & Bonpl. ex Willd.) Gaussen, without basionym ref.; Stachycarpus taxifolius (Kunth) Tiegh.; Van-tieghemia densifolia (Kunth) A.V.Bobrov & Melikyan; Van-tieghemia meridensis (J.Buchholz & N.E.Gray) A.V.Bobrov & Melikyan; Van-tieghemia montana (Humb. & Bonpl. ex Willd.) A.V.Bobrov & Melikyan; Taxus montana Humb. & Bonpl. ex Willd.; Torreya humboldtii Lindl. & Gordon; Torreya montana (Humb. & Bonpl. ex Willd.) Lindl. & Gordon

= Prumnopitys montana =

Species of conifer

Prumnopitys montana is a species of conifer in the family Podocarpaceae. It is a tree native to Colombia, Ecuador, northern Peru, and northwestern Venezuela. It grows up to 30 metres tall, and is dioecious or rarely monoecious and capable of producing cones at any time of the year. It grows in Andean montane moist forests and high-elevation shrubland from 1,500 to 3,600 metres elevation. At lower elevations it is associated with trees in the genera Bejaria, Citharexylum, Clusia, Juglans, Ocotea, Oreopanax, and Weinmannia. At high elevations it grows in ridgetop plant communities dominated by ericaceous shrubs and species of Podocarpus.

The Latin specific epithet montana refers to mountains or coming from mountains.
