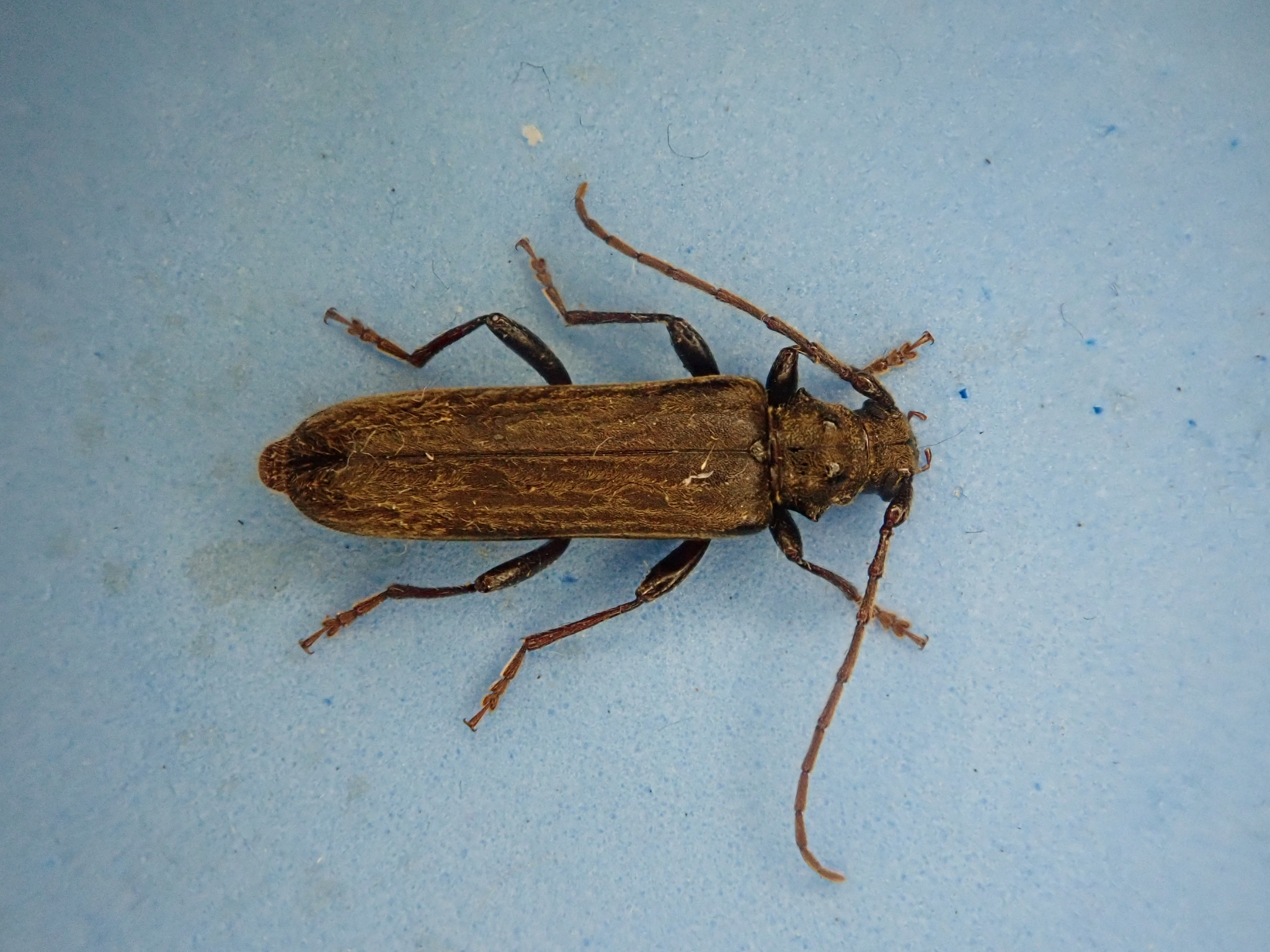

Scientific classification
- Kingdom: Animalia
- Phylum: Arthropoda
- Class: Insecta
- Order: Coleoptera
- Suborder: Polyphaga
- Infraorder: Cucujiformia
- Family: Cerambycidae
- Genus: Ambeodontus
- Species: A. tristis

Binomial name
- Ambeodontus tristis (Fabricius, 1775)

= Ambeodontus tristis =

Species of beetle

Ambeodontus tristis is a species of beetle in the subfamily Cerambycinae.
