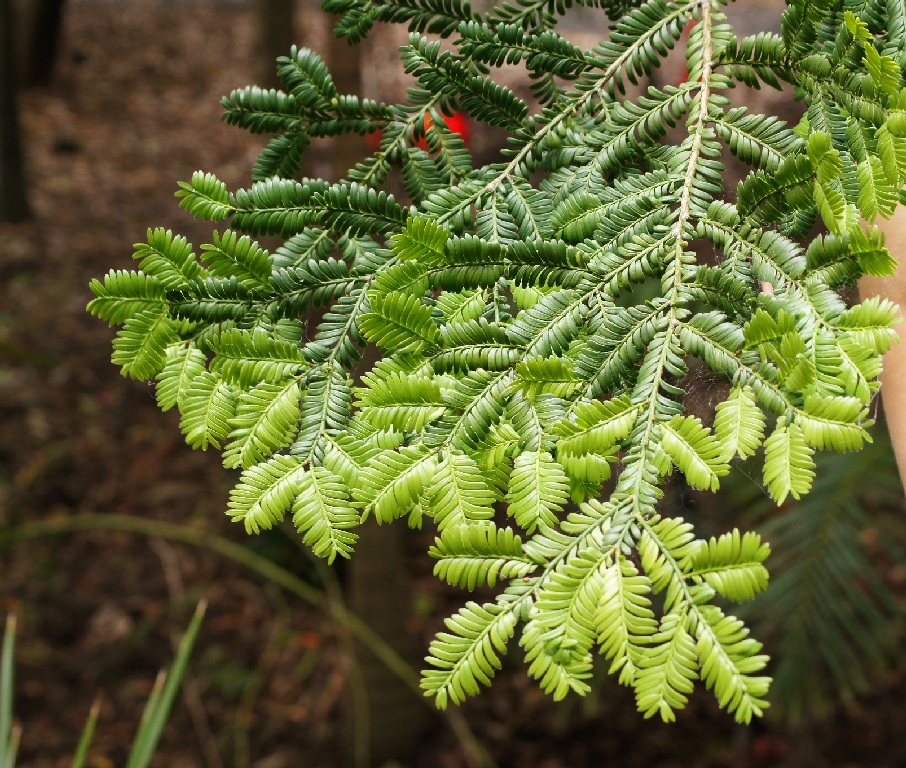

Conservation status
- Vulnerable (IUCN 3.1)

Scientific classification
- Kingdom: Plantae
- Clade: Tracheophytes
- Clade: Gymnosperms
- Division: Pinophyta
- Class: Pinopsida
- Order: Araucariales
- Family: Podocarpaceae
- Genus: Pectinopitys
- Species: P. ladei

Binomial name
- Pectinopitys ladei (F.M.Bailey) C.N.Page

Synonyms
- Podocarpus ladei F.M.Bailey; Prumnopitys ladei (F.M.Bailey) de Laub.

= Pectinopitys ladei =

Species of conifer

Pectinopitys ladei, syn. Prumnopitys ladei, and commonly known as the Mount Spurgeon black pine, Mount Spurgeon brown pine, or Mount Spurgeon kauri pine, is a species of conifer in the family Podocarpaceae. It is endemic to north-eastern Queensland, Australia, where it is restricted to Mount Lewis, Mount Spurgeon, and a few other localities nearby.
