= John Theodore Buchholz =

American botanist

John Theodore Buchholz (July 14, 1888, in Polk County, Nebraska–1951) was an American botanist, specialising in gymnosperms.

Selected bibliography

- Polyembryony among Abietineae. Bot. Gaz. 69: 153-167 (1920).
- Embryo development and polyembryony in relation to the phylogeny of conifers. Amer. J. Bot. 7: 125-145 (1920).
- The classification of Coniferales. Trans. Illinois State Acad. Sci. 25: 112–113. (1933).
- The generic segregation of the Sequoias. Amer. J. Bot. 26: 535-538 (1939).
- A comparison of the embryogeny of Picea and Abies. Madroño 6: 156-167 (1942).
- Generic and subgeneric distribution of the Coniferales. Bot. Gaz. 110: 80-91 (1948).
- Additions to the coniferous flora of New Caledonia. Bull. Mus. Hist. Nat. (Paris) sér.2, 21: 279-286 (1949).
- A flat-leaved pine from Annam, Indo-China. Amer. J. Bot. 38: 245-252 (1951).
