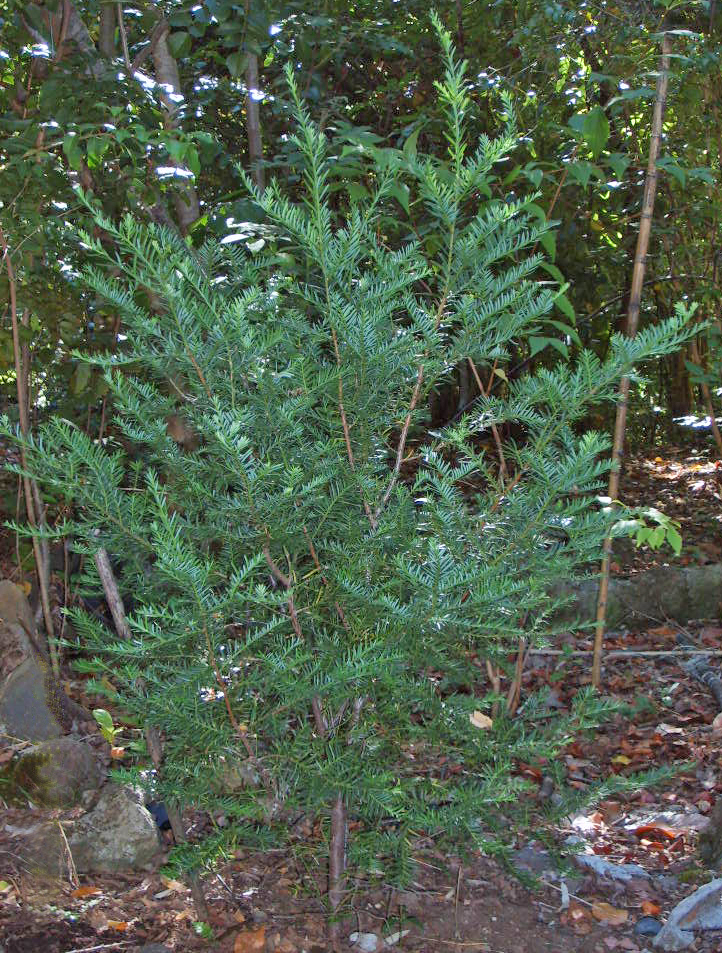

Conservation status
- Vulnerable (IUCN 3.1)

Scientific classification
- Kingdom: Plantae
- Clade: Tracheophytes
- Clade: Gymnosperms
- Division: Pinophyta
- Class: Pinopsida
- Order: Araucariales
- Family: Podocarpaceae
- Genus: Prumnopitys
- Species: P. andina

Binomial name
- Prumnopitys andina (Poepp. ex Endl.) de Laub.

Synonyms
- 9 synonyms: Nageia andina (Poepp. ex Endl.) F.Muell.; Nageia valdiviana (J.Nelson) Kuntze; Podocarpus andinus Poepp. ex Endl.; Podocarpus spicatus Poepp.; Podocarpus valdivianus J.Nelson; Prumnopitys andina subsp. blijdensteinii Silba; Prumnopitys elegans Phil.; Prumnopitys spicata Molloy & Muñoz-Schick; Stachycarpus andinus (Poepp. ex Endl.) Tiegh.

= Prumnopitys andina =

Species of conifer

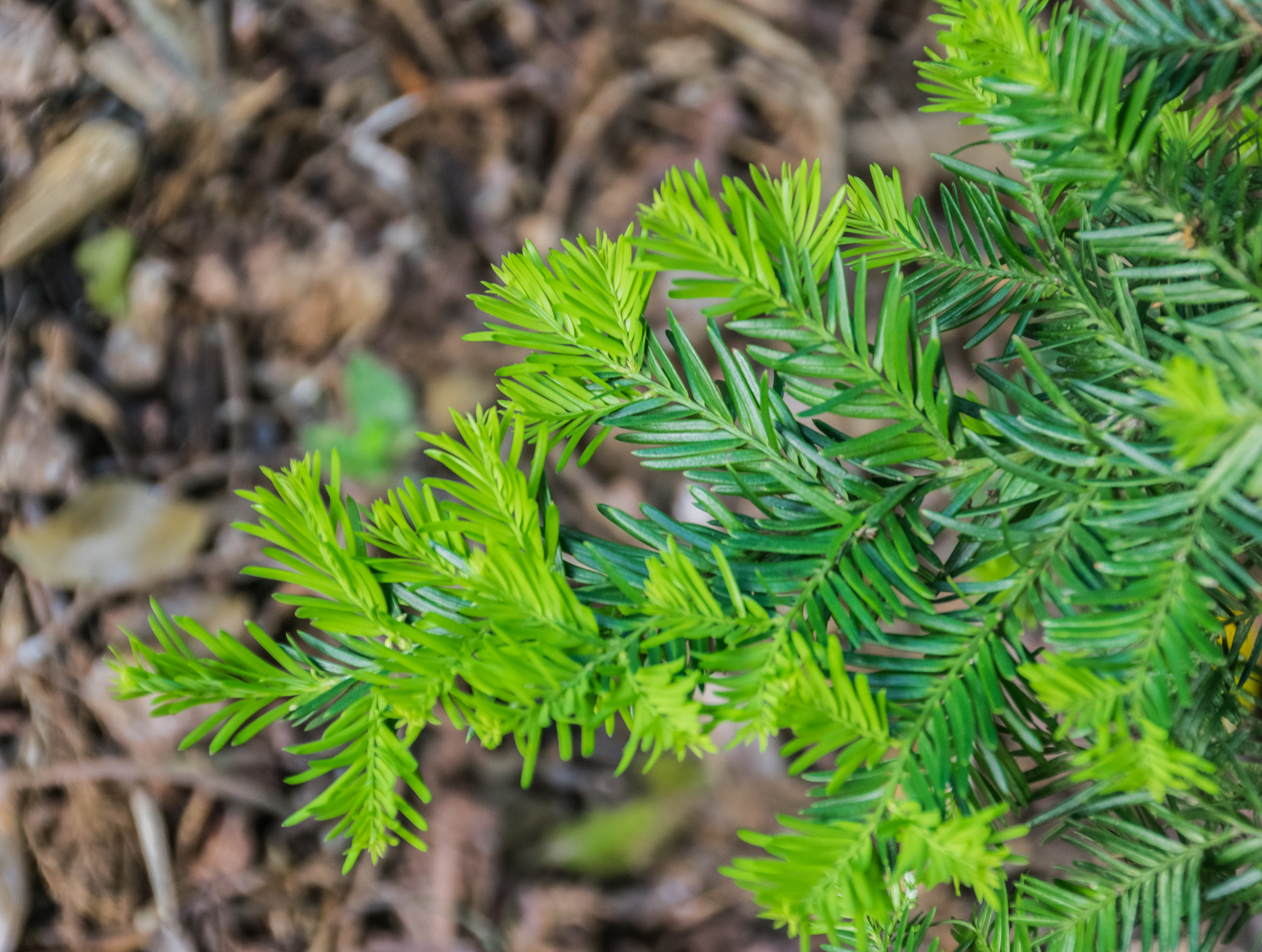
Prumnopitys andina foliage

Prumnopitys andina, the lleuque or Chilean plum yew, is a coniferous tree native to south-central Chile and a few areas in adjacent parts of westernmost Argentina from 36 to 40° South latitude. It lives on moderately wet soils, preferably on Andean slopes from 500–1,100 meters (1,600–3,600 ft).

== Description ==
It grows up to 30 m (98 ft) high, with a trunk up to 2 m (6.6 ft) in diameter. The leaves are linear to sickle-shaped, 15–30 mm long and 2 mm broad. The seed cones are highly modified, reducing to a central stem 2–4 cm long bearing 1–4 scales, each scale maturing berry-like, oval, 10–15 mm long and 10 mm broad, green maturing dark purple, with a soft edible pulp covering the single seed. The seeds are dispersed by birds, which eat the 'berries' and pass the seeds in their droppings. Seeds are very difficult to germinate. It has a straight and cylindrical trunk, with gray and shiny bark.

== Taxonomy ==
This species was formerly placed in the related genus Podocarpus as Podocarpus andinus. It was also briefly moved to Prumnopitys spicata in 1999, however this move was soon after shown to be in error and it was reverted.

== Uses ==
The cones (an aril) are 1.5 cm (0.59 in) long, blue-purple in color, are eaten by Native American people in Chile, and a marmalade is produced with them. The tree is also occasionally grown as an ornamental tree and a hedge in oceanic climate areas in northwest Europe and the Pacific Northwest of North America. In these areas, it is also sometimes known as "plum-yew" or "plum-fruited yew", though these names are more commonly applied to plants in the genus Cephalotaxus.

The wood is a yellowish color and has a good quality. It is used in furniture and construction.

== Conservation ==
Evidence suggests that very little regeneration is occurring to replace current ageing trees in populations. In 2007, the Forestry Commission planted large numbers of young trees at Bedgebury Pinetum in the UK as part of a project aiming to conserve the genetic resources of endangered conifers.
