= Christopher Nigel Page =

English botanist

- Born: 11 November 1942; Cheltenham
- Died: 9 December 2022 (aged 80); Stithians, Cornwall
- Education: Durham University (BSc), Newcastle University (PhD)
- Scientific career
- Fields: Ferns; Pinophyta; Spermatophytes
- Author abbrev. (botany): C.N.Page

Christopher Nigel Page (1942–2022) was an English botanist who specialised in ferns and spermatophytes. He also worked on conifers, naming species of Afrocarpus, for example Afrocarpus dawei and Afrocarpus gracilior, Sundacarpus and Retrophyllum. He read botany at Durham University then gained a PhD at Newcastle University, followed by a post-doctoral fellowship from 1968 to 1970 at the University of Queensland, in Brisbane, working on Queensland pteridophytes, before returning to the UK to work at Oxford University for a year. In 1971 he became a Fellow of the Linnean Society and that same year he joined the Royal Botanic Garden Edinburgh (RBGE), founding the RGBE Conifer Conservation Programme, now The International Conifer Conservation Programme, in 1991. In 1976–77 he visited eastern Australia (Brisbane and Hobart) to work on pteridophytes (particularly Doodia, Cheilanthes and Adiantum) and also Japan, Taiwan, Hong Kong, The Philippines and New Zealand. He retired from the RBGE in 1996, moving to live in Cornwall. He joined Camborne School of Mines, University of Exeter, in 2004, teaching part-time on the Environmental Science and Technology degree in CSM, and also in Biosciences until 2008. Some of his research in Cornwall involved experiments in regreening former extractive minerals sites, which he presented in 2017 in Parliament, with Professor Hylke Glass, also of CSM, as co-author. He had given a talk on BBC4 in 2008 in the series "Meetings with Remarkable Trees" on monkey puzzles (Araucaria araucana). He retired, as Senior Honorary Research Fellow, in June 2022. He was editor of the Transactions of the Royal Geological Society of Cornwall 1996–2015, then President from 2016 to 2020 (succeeded by Professor Frances Wall of Camborne School of Mines), and received the society's Bolitho Gold Medal in 2016.

== Personal life ==
He had four children from two marriages. Zoe, Erica and Angus from his first marriage and Tamsin from his second.

== Books ==
- The Ferns of Great Britain and Ireland, 1982, 1997. Cambridge University Press. 1st edn ISBN 9780521232135, 2nd edn ISBN 0521583802
- A Natural History of Britain's Ferns, 1988. New Naturalist 74. Collins. ISBN 0-00-219383-3
- The Evolution of Arborescent Gymnosperms, 2023. Cambridge University Press. ISBN 1009263099, ISBN 9781009263092, 2 volumes (volume one on the conifers of the Northern hemisphere and volume 2 on the conifers of the southern hemisphere).
