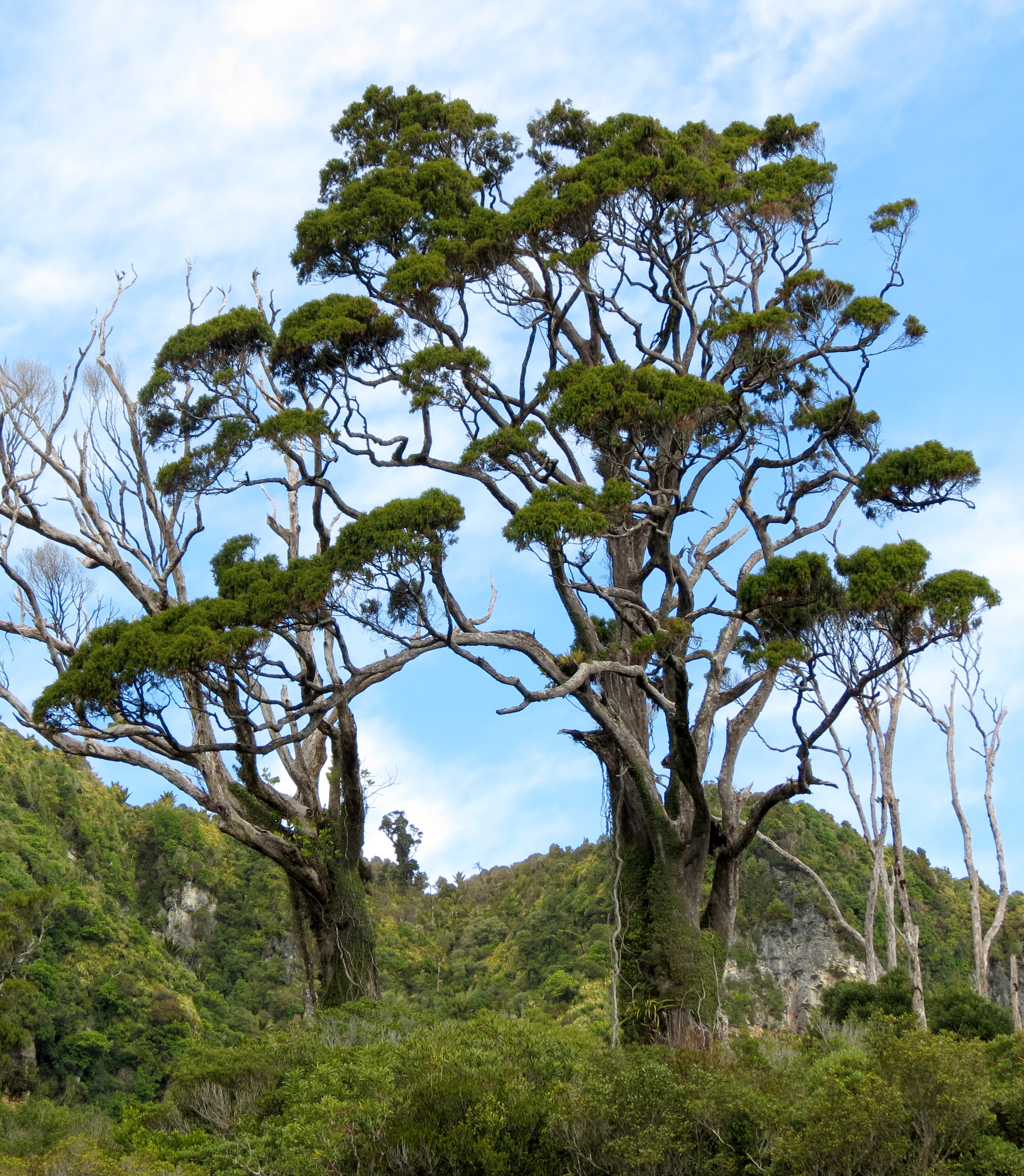
- A mature D. cupressinum specimen in the South Island's West Coast Region

Conservation status
- Least Concern (IUCN 3.1)

Scientific classification
- Kingdom: Plantae
- Clade: Tracheophytes
- Clade: Gymnosperms
- Division: Pinophyta
- Class: Pinopsida
- Order: Araucariales
- Family: Podocarpaceae
- Genus: Dacrydium
- Species: D. cupressinum

Binomial name
- Dacrydium cupressinum Sol. ex Lamb.

Synonyms
- Dacrydium cupressiforme Carrière; Thalamia cupressina Spreng

= Dacrydium cupressinum =

Species of coniferous tree

Dacrydium cupressinum, commonly known as rimu, is a species of conifer in the family Podocarpaceae, native to New Zealand. The tree usually reaches 35 metres (100 feet) in height, but may reach up to 60 metres (200 feet) and can have a stout trunk up to 2 m (6 ft 7 in) in diameter. It is dioecious, meaning individual trees are either male or female. Rimu is the country's most common native conifer, its range covers the North, South, and Stewart Islands. Rimu has an estimated lifespan of 600–800 years, although it may live as long as 1,200 years.

The name D. cupressinum was first published invalidly in 1786 by Daniel Solander and Georg Forster. However the species was first given a valid description in 1806 by Aylmer Lambert. The second part of the scientific name, cupressinum, was given because of the tree's similarity with cypress species. Rimu's fruits are consumed by various birds such as bellbirds, kererū, and the tūī. Rimu's fruits also provide an important source of food and vitamins for the native flightless parrot, the critically endangered kākāpō, which will only mate during years of heavy fruiting. Many different plants grow on the tree's trunk and branches, using it for support, which are called epiphytes and hemi-epiphytes. Rimu also plays host to numerous insect species.

In Māori culture, D. cupressinum is of great importance. Rimu had several medicinal purposes for Māori, and the British missionary, Richard Taylor, described the fruit as prized by the natives. In 1773, the British explorer, James Cook, brewed the first native beer at Tamatea / Dusky Sound, by extracting the young tips of the tree's branches. Rimu was once the most harvested timber, popular for flooring, furniture making, wagon building, and other uses, before it was protected by law. The tree's timber has very durable and resilient texture. Rimu's conservation status was assessed by the IUCN Red List in 2013 as "Least Concern", and its population trend was assessed as "Stable".

== Description ==
Dacrydium cupressinum (rimu) is a species of dioecious (either male or female) evergreen conifer in the family Podocarpaceae, and usually reaches 35 metres (115 feet) in height, but may reach up to 60 m (200 ft) tall, and can have a stout trunk up to 1.5–2 m (4 ft 11 in – 6 ft 7 in) in diameter. The trunk is usually cylindrical and smooth. D. cupressinum grows in an erect (occasionally forked), and usually a monopodial manner, meaning it grows from the main stem. When reaching its maximum height, it is typically unbranched for 20 m (70 ft) of its height. The tree exhibits a pyramid-like shape in the early growth stages, and the crown of mature trees evolves into a domed shape, with the main branches spreading outwards or ascending.

Its bark is grey to dark-brown in colour, shedding in large, elongated, thick flakes. When the outer layers of bark flake off, a distinctive wavy pattern of parallel raised ridges is visible on the new bark beneath. These lines of ridges have been described as resembling the contour lines on a topographic map. Areas of bark between the ridges have small pointed projections with porous tissue that allow air to penetrate the bark, providing oxygen to the cells of the tree beneath the bark. The wood is typically a dark-red colour, gradually becoming a yellow-brown colour after exposure to sunlight. D. cupressinum has an estimated lifespan of 600–800 years, but can reach 1000 years old, although some specimens examined at the foothills of Mount Ruapehu suggest it may live as long as 1200 years.

Dacrydium cupressinum is characterised by its drooping and hanging foliage. Juvenile branches are slender, with hanging branchlets. In adult specimens, there are fewer branches, which are spreading, and also have slender and hanging branchlets. The tree's leaves vary in colour from dark-green to bronze-green, red-green, or in some cases orange. They are typically a yellowish-green colour and about 4 mm long, and arranged in an overlapping pattern (imbricated). Juvenile leaves measure 4–7–(10) millimetres in length and 0.5–1 mm in width. They are acute, long and narrow, slightly curved, and vaguely sickle-shaped (subfalcate) in character. Subadult leaves are ascending and are 4–6 mm long. Adult leaves are similar, but they are flattened down (appressed), rigid, and are triangular in shape.

Like all conifers, D. cupressinum does not have flowers, but instead has cones (strobili); with male and female examples first seen on subadult specimens. In male specimens, cones are solitary or paired, terminal, measuring 5–10 mm, and are oblong in shape, producing yellow pollen. The tree's ovules (female reproductive structures) are solitary and at the tip of up-curved branchlets. Its receptacles (fleshy fruit-holding structures) form a cup that is red or deep-orange in colour and measures about 1–2 mm in length. The pollen cones are found at the tips of branches and are oval to oblong in shape, measuring 7–10 mm long and 4 mm wide. Each pollen-bearing leaf (microsporophyll) has a pointed tip, is green in colour, and is 2–2.5 mm long. At its base, it holds two yellow pollen sacs.

Fruiting takes over a year to mature and often coincides with the presence of young female cones. The fruits are most commonly seen between February and May. D. cupressinum is a morphologically distinctive species, although it is sometimes misidentified with the seedlings of Manoao colensoi, which instead have glossier, coarser leaves. The tree's seed cones grow at the ends of short, curved branchlets or on the sides, measuring about 6–10 mm long. The bracts (specialised leaves) attached are short and barely visible when the cones mature into a swollen, orange to red colour. The tree's seeds are ovoid in shape, dark brown to black in colour, slightly flattened, are tiny at about 4–5 mm long, and they ripen to a black colour. D. cupressinum has a genetic diploid chromosome count of 20.

=== Phytochemistry ===
In terms of chemical composition, the foliage of D. cupressinum contains various sesquiterpenes, with their levels showing significant variation between specimens, which is similar to the differences observed in diterpene levels. There are twelve known sesquiterpenes in the tree that have been identified by a 1985 study, but none of which show any structural similarity to lauren-1-ene. The distinctive diterpene lauren-1-ene was first discovered in the foliage of the tree, however, the concentration of this compound, along with other diterpenes, also shows significant variation between D. cupressinum specimens.

Dacrydium cupressinum contains high levels of the unique sesquiterpene terpene compounds of 9-epi-β-caryophyllene. The tree also has a distinctive flavonoid glycoside profile; the tree possesses flavonol-3-O-rhamnoglucosides and also, to a lesser extent, 3-0-methyl-myricetin glycoside compounds.

== Gallery ==
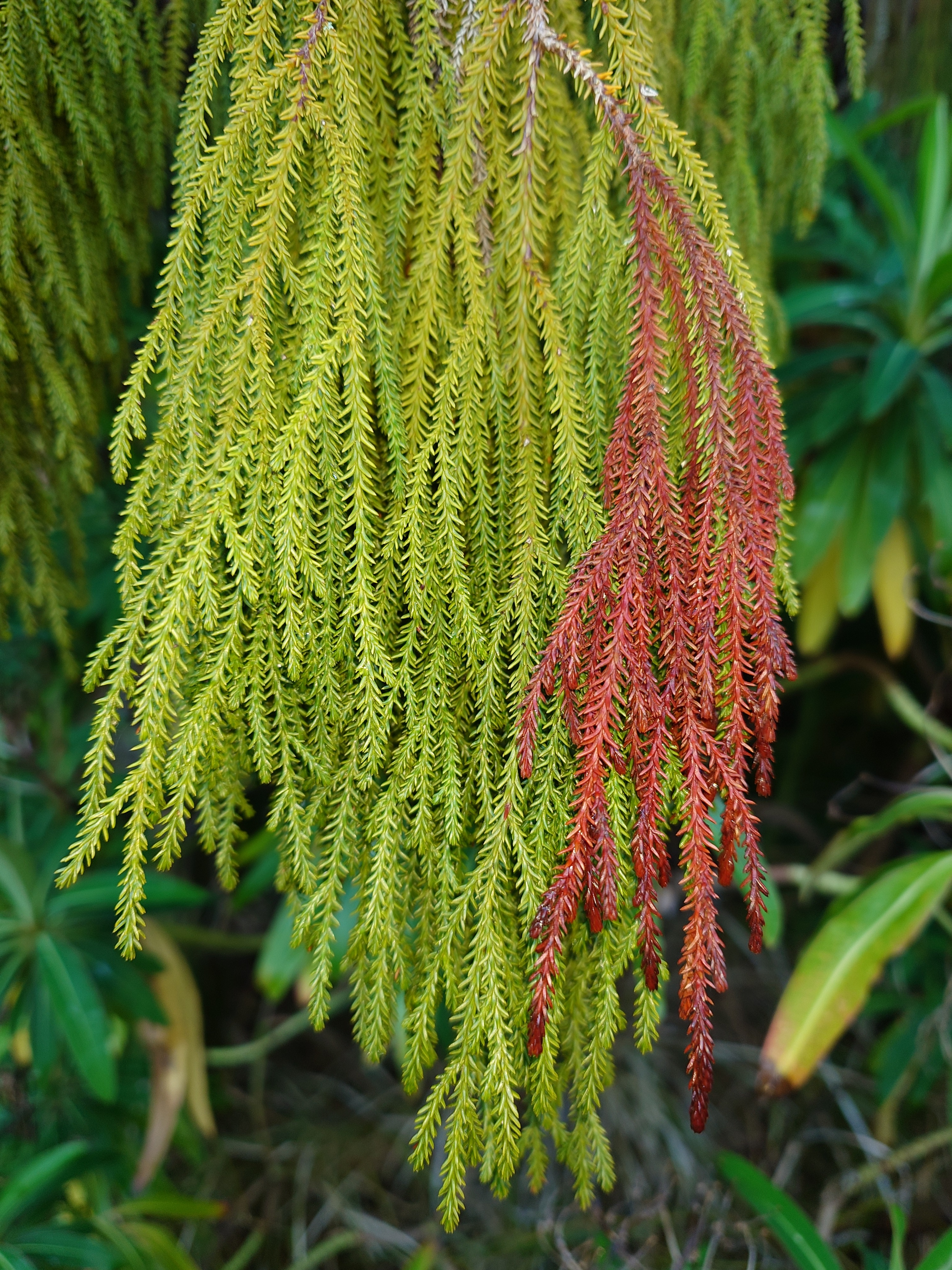
Its leaves vary in colour, but are typically greenish-yellow. They are typically arranged in an overlapping pattern (imbricated).

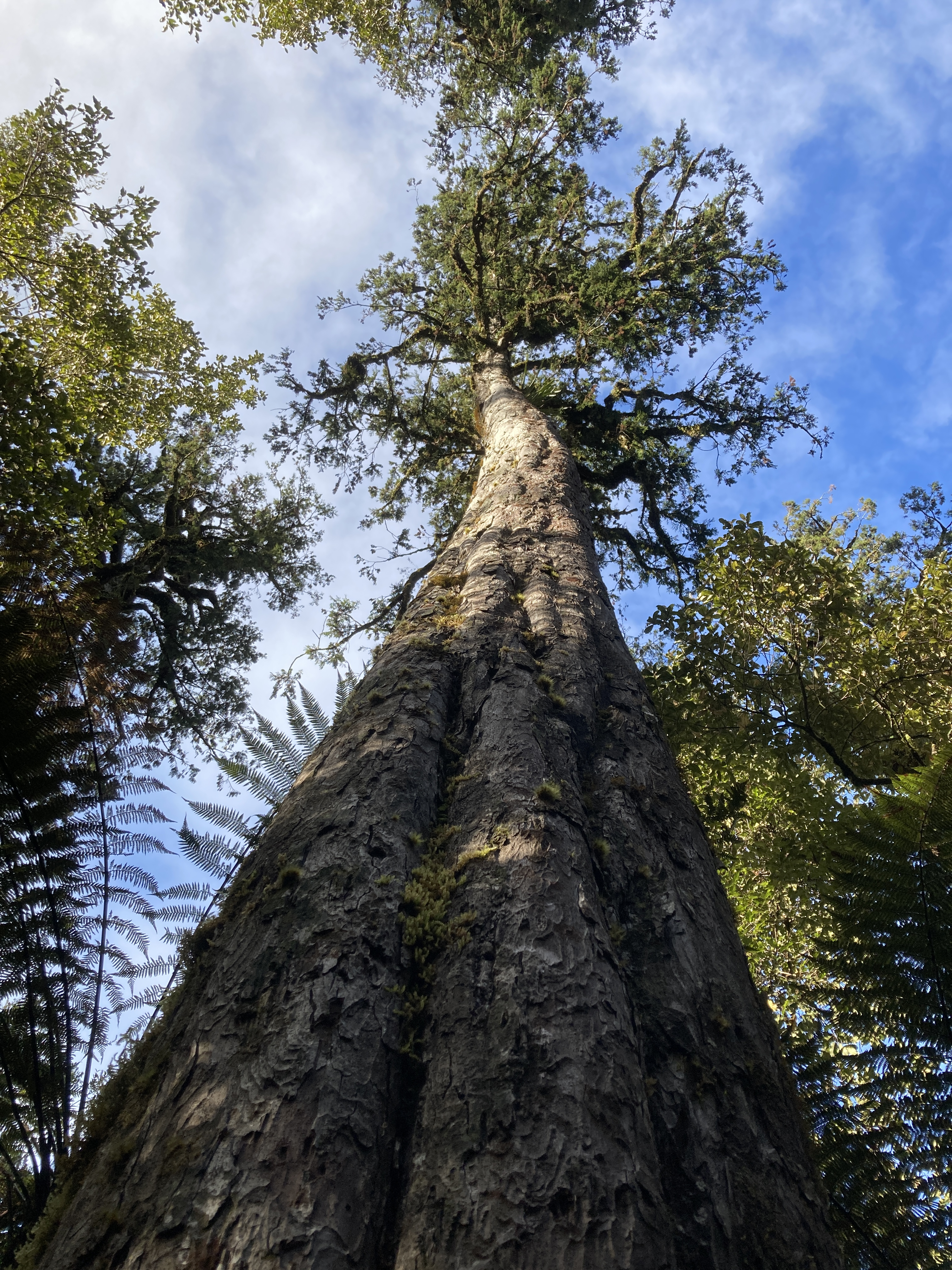
A mature specimen growing above the canopy in a forest in the West Coast Region of the South Island

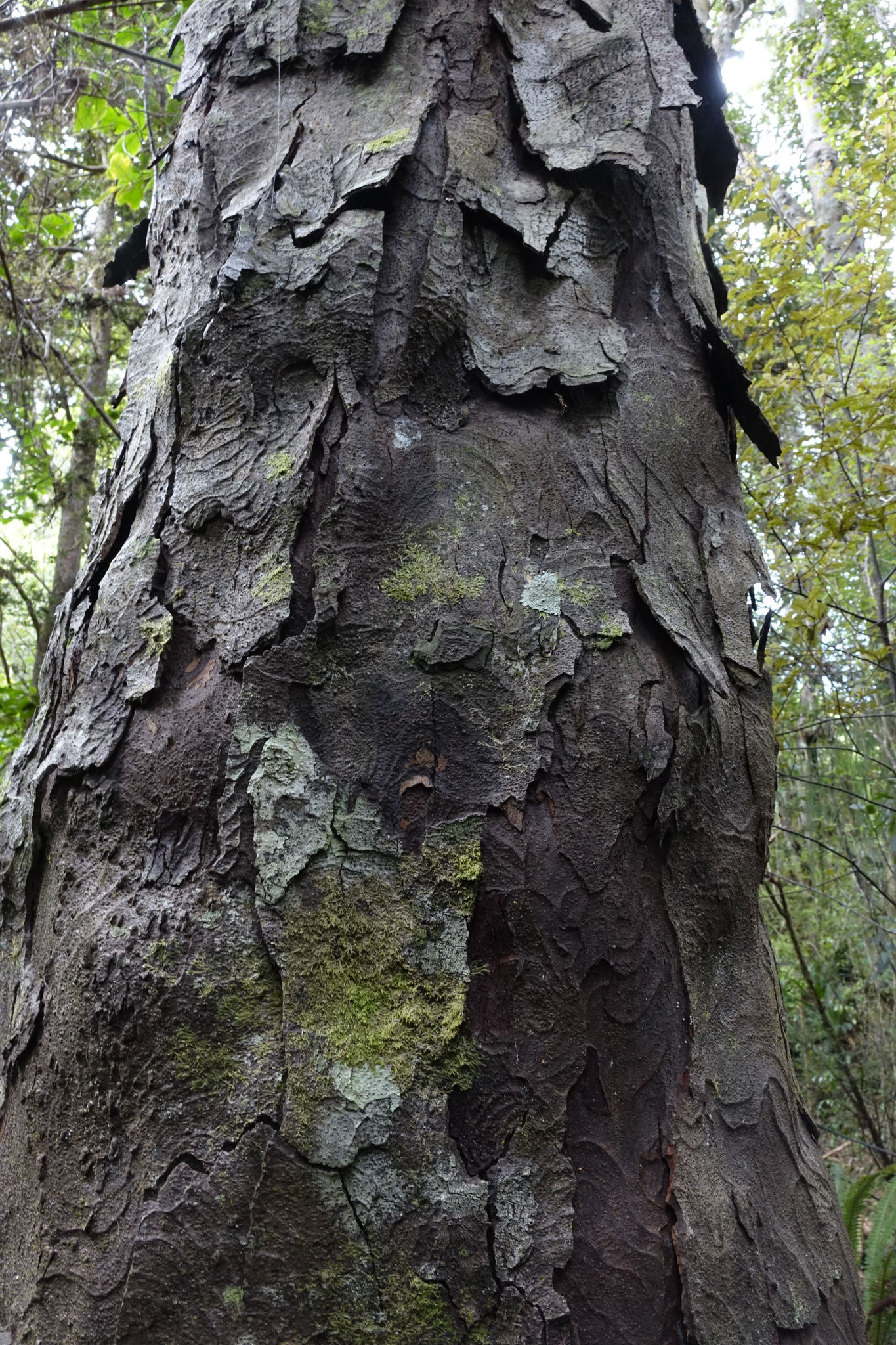
Its bark is dark-brown in colour, shedding in large, thick flakes, while the wood is a dark-red colour.

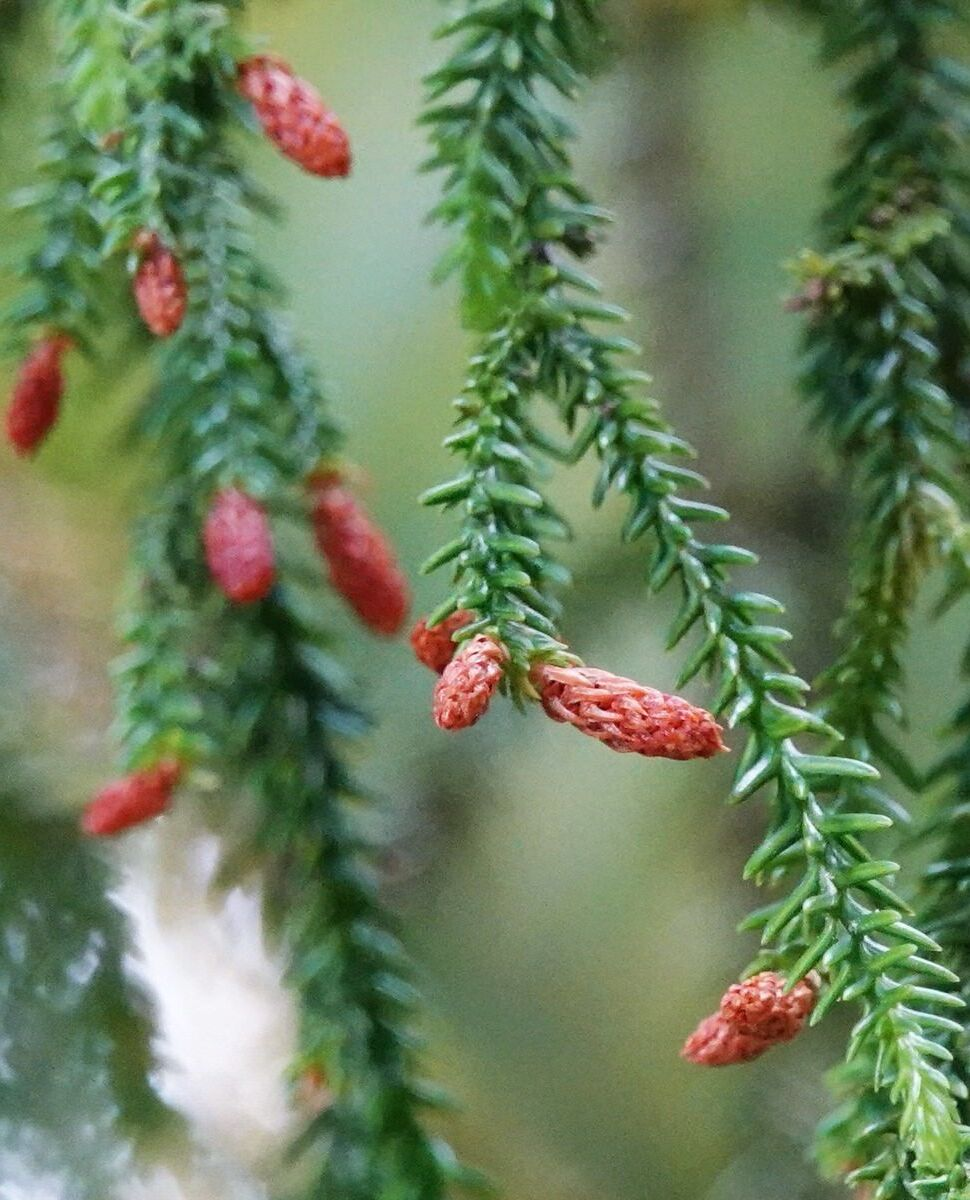
Its strobili, also known as cones, are solitary or paired, terminal, and they are typically a red or a deep-orange colour.

== Taxonomy ==
=== Evolution ===
Phylogeny of Dacrydium

- - D. cupressinum Solander ex Forster
  - - - D. balansae Brongniart & Gris
      - - D. nausoriense de Laubenfels
        - - - D. araucarioides Brongniart & Gris
            - D. nidulum de Laubenfels
          - - D. guillauminii Buchholz
            - D. lycopodioides Brongniart & Gris
    - - - - D. elatum (Roxburgh) Wallich ex Hooker
          - D. pectinatum de Laubenfels
        - - D. magnum de Laubenfels
          - D. xanthandrum Pilger
      - - D. gibbsiae Stapf
        - - D. beccarii Parlatore
          - - D. comosum Corner
            - D. gracile de Laubenfels

Cladogram of the phylogenetical reconstruction of the genus Dacrydium, from research published in 2021.

Dacrydium cupressinum is the only member of the genus Dacrydium native to New Zealand. A 1998 study on the phylogeny of the Podocarpaceae family examined the evolution of D. cupressinum and various other species. The research identified it as sister to a clade (group) consisting of various other Podocarpaceae species, including members of the genus Dacrycarpus and Podocarpus. This discovery revealed that D. cupressinum shares a common biological ancestor with these genera, while maintaining its evolutionary uniqueness.

A 2020 study suggested that the Dacrydium genus originated in New Caledonia, based on a historical biogeographic reconstruction. Despite this, macrofossil evidence strongly supports a more broader Australasian origin, and another study also suggests that Dacrydium originated in Australasia during the Late Cretaceous epoch and dispersed into Southeast Asia in the Early Oligocene. Stull et al. 2021 investigated the role of plant evolution, analysing how ecological changes have shaped biodiversity and trait development over long timescales. In the study, they revealed that polyploidy is a primary driver of microevolution in plants, but its broader impact on macroevolutionary diversification and phenotypic innovation remains uncertain. In the study, researchers produced an ancestral reconstruction of gymnosperms using RNA sequencing. D. cupressinum is the type species of the genus Dacrydium.

=== History ===
The name D. cupressinum was first published invalidly in 1786 by the European naturalist Georg Forster, using a description by Daniel Solander, in a publication entitled, De Plantis Esculentis Insularum Oceani Australis Commentatio Botanica. The British botanist Aylmer Lambert provided the first valid description of the species in his 1806 work, A Description of the Genus Pinus. The name, Thalamia cupressina, comes from a later 1826 description of D. cupressinum where Kurt Sprengel attempted to place the taxon, D. cupressinum into the genus, Thalamia. His placement has not been accepted by other plant taxonomists, and hence the name given by Sprengel becomes a homotypic synonym. In 1855, French botanist Élie-Abel Carrière described the species Dacrydium cupressiforme, in his work Traité Général des Conifères. What he thought to be a new species is now recognised as being Dacrydium cupressinum and hence is a heterotypic synonym of the species described earlier in 1806.

=== Etymology ===
The etymology (word origin) of D. cupressinum's genus name, Dacrydium, comes from the Greek dakryon (δάκρυδον), which translates to 'tear-drop' or simply 'tear'; one possibility, suggested by Dutch botanist Aljos Farjon, stated that the genus name could be in reference to the resinous drops exuded by the tree. However, English-born botanist Thomas Kirk, in his 1889 revision titled The Forest Flora of New Zealand, instead hypothesised that Dacrydium is in reference to the weeping habit of the trees. The specific epithet (second part of the scientific name), cupressinum, translates simply to 'cypress'; which refers to the tree's similarity with Cupressus species. D. cupressinum is commonly known as rimu. The word rimu (or limu) is typically used in Polynesian languages to describe seaweeds and mosses; it is likely that the name was applied to the tree due to the similarity of the tree's leaves to seaweed.

== Ecology ==
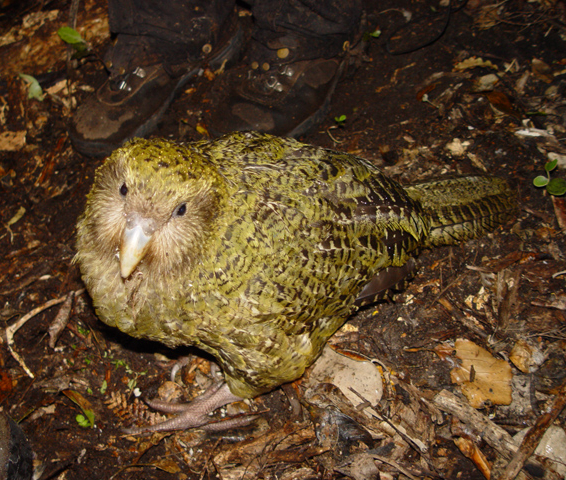
The kākāpō feeds on the fruits of D. cupressinum, which are high in calcium and vitamins.

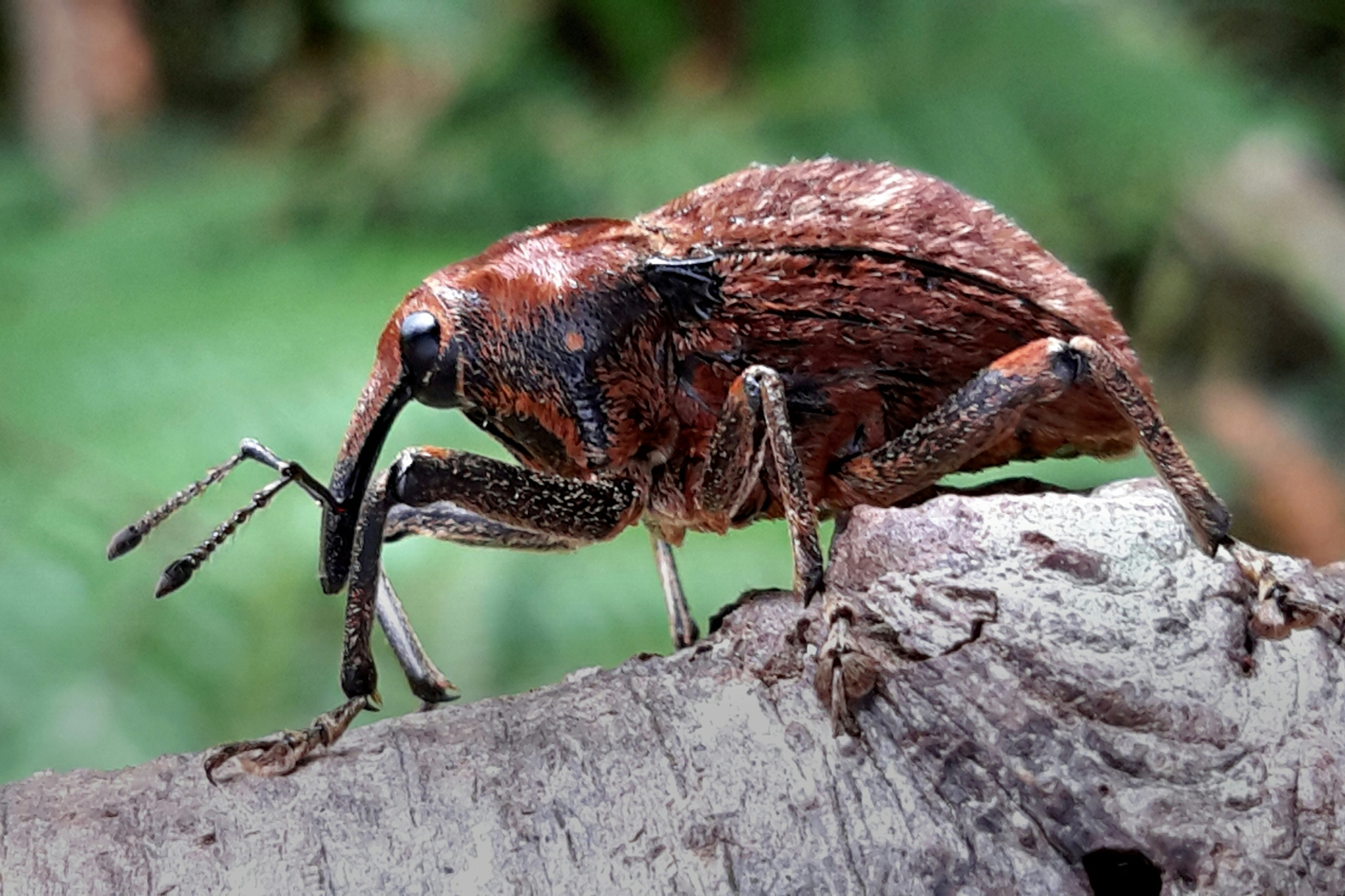
Rhynchodes ursus, a weevil, along with several other insect species, feeds on the stems and leaves of D. cupressinum.

Dacrydium cupressinum's seeds are dispersed by gravity and by fruit-eating animals (frugivores). These seeds are well-adapted to be dispersed by birds; primary dispersers of the seeds include bellbirds, kererū, and the tūī. Brown creepers, fantails, grey warblers, riflemen, silvereyes, and tomtits have been observed in association with the tree. Other birds, such as white-eyes and house sparrows, feed on the tree's receptacles (fleshy fruit-like structures). The tree is known to be browsed by deer and possums, which browse the seedlings and consume the foliage and branchlets, respectively. Excrements of the wētā are frequently found in seed traps, which could indicate that wētā consume the seeds of the tree. The seeds have been recorded being destroyed by chaffinches, mice, rats, and wētā.

Dacrydium cupressinum's fruits are an important food and vitamin resource for the native flightless parrot, the kākāpō, which feeds on the fruits. The fruits are high in calcium and vitamins, and the kākāpō may have adapted to survive prolonged periods of limited access to these resources. The kākāpō will only mate during years of heavy fruiting.

Several species of insects have been recorded as feeding on the stems and leaves, including: stick insects, weevils, Pyrgotis species, and looper caterpillars, from Pseudocoremia fenerata. Other wood-boring insects on D. cupressinum include: Ambeodontus tristis, Calliprason pallidus, Prionoplus reticularis, Rhynchodes ursus, and Platypus species. The tree also serves as a host for two beetle species, Euderia squamosa and Sommatidia antarctica, both of which lay their eggs and feed on the tree. Despite these two beetles sharing similar life cycles, certain distinguishing features allow for the differentiation between their infestations and association with the tree. The larvae of Otiorhynchus sulcatus, an introduced species of weevil, can cause damage to seedling's roots in nursery beds. D. cupressinum is very sensitive to fire and is one of the most flammable New Zealand tree species. It is likely the tree has not evolved to be resistant against fire or develop particular traits against flammability, as fire is uncommon in the communities where the tree grows. D. cupressinum is a very wind-resistant tree, particularly when growing on deep soils. However, if damaged, the trees will not regrow by producing coppice shoots, which is a tree regrowth method by producing new shoots.

=== Epiphytes ===
Dacrydium cupressinum serves as a host for numerous vascular epiphytes, which are plants that grow on other plants. Metrosideros robusta is perhaps one of the most prominent epiphyte species in the North Island and the northern South Island, in which it takes root in the tree, extending its roots downward to reach the ground. Over time, M. robusta can eventually replace its host as the original tree due to old age or suppression. Other common species that grow as epiphytes on the tree includes Astelia solandri, Freycinetia banksii, and Griselinia lucida. The New Zealand naturalist Walter Oliver conducted a study in 1930 of epiphyte and hemi-epiphyte relationships with D. cupressinum in Gollans Valley, near Wellington. Oliver documented eleven and twelve species in a sunny habitat and a shady habitat, respectively, as epiphytes on the tree. Oliver also mentioned that Nothopanax arboreum, a hemi-epiphyte species, was common.

=== Fungi ===
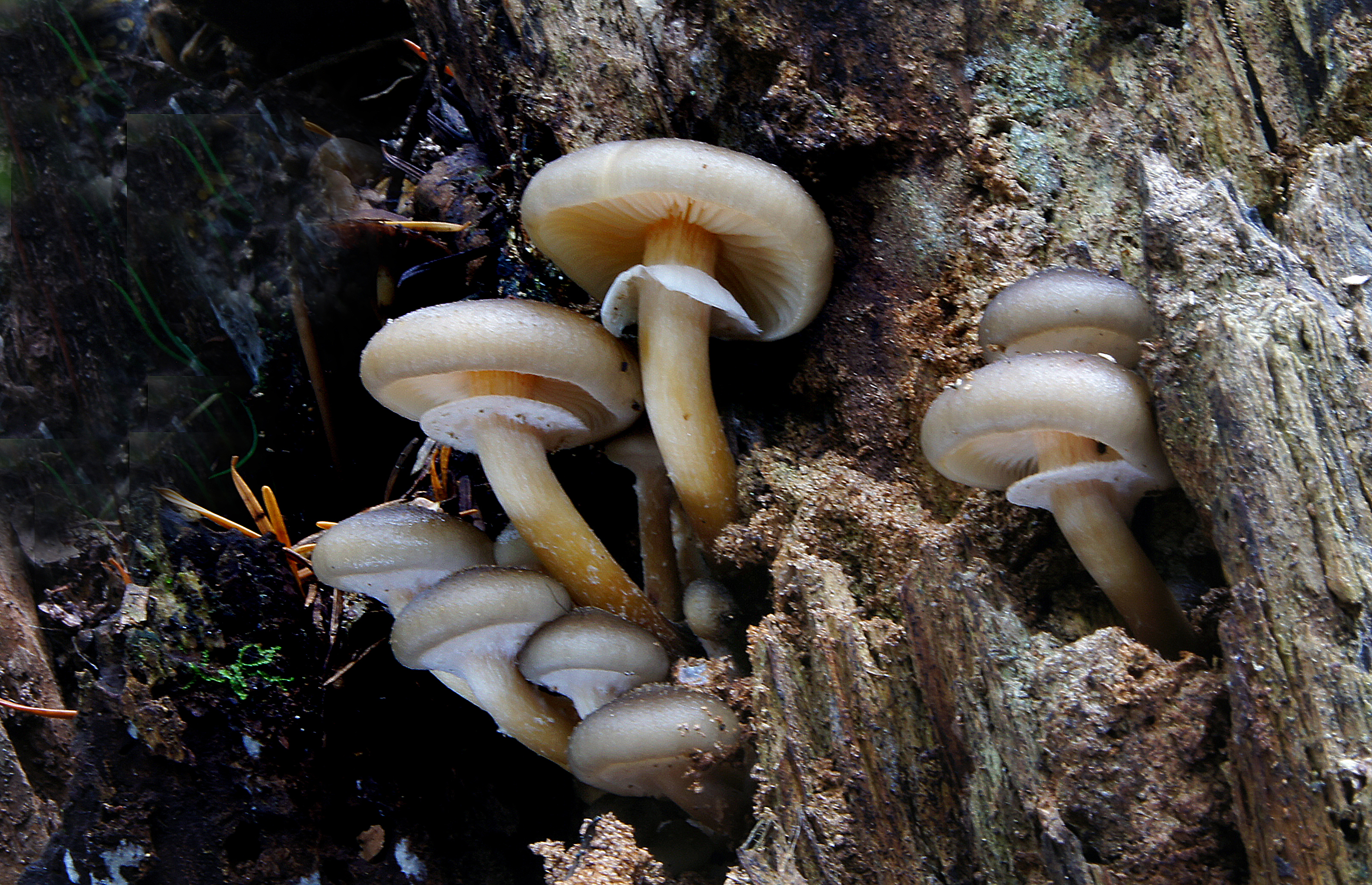
Armillaria novae-zelandiae, a parasitic species of fungus to D. cupressinum

The New Zealand mycologist, G. H. Cunningham, recorded thirty-eight species of Thelephoraceae and twenty-seven species of Polyporaceae as saprophytes on D. cupressinum. The most common fungi associated with the tree, according to a 2012 study in the New Zealand Journal of Botany, are Armillaria novae-zelandiae and Ganoderma applanatum. The fungi species that were recorded to a lesser extent included: Hypochnicium polonense, Rigidoporus concrescens, and Irpex species. Armillaria mellea is the only species of fungus known to be parasitic to the tree. A 2009 study of the fungal endophytes on various Podocarpaceae species revealed that D. cupressinum had the highest diversity of endophytes among the studied species; several fungi genera mentioned as hosts on D. cupressinum were: Colletotrichum, Cylindrobasidium, Ophiognomonia, Pezicula, Phomopsis, Phyllosticta, and Xylaria. The mycorrhizal fungi nodules of Dacrydium species are small, at about 0.5–0.7 mm (0.020–0.028 in) in diameter.

=== Reproduction ===
Dacrydium cupressinum is pollinated by the wind. D. cupressinum's seeds typically remain dormant for at least 30 days, but sometimes much longer prior to germination. Beveridge (1964) estimates that a mature specimen would possess about 18 kg (40 lb) of ripe seeds and receptacles or 1.8 kg (4.0 lb) of clean sound seeds, ultimately producing about 200,000 seeds. The seeds ripen between March and May, about 15–18 months following pollination and are later dispersed for over 1–2 months, although infertile seeds may continue to be released for a significantly longer duration. D. cupressinum's seedlings will not establish themselves where there is moderate to severe root competition and a moderately dense canopy because of low light intensities. The tree prefers sites with partial shade.

Dacrydium cupressinum is known for exhibiting mast seeding, which is the synchronised periodicity of seed production. In the Pureora Forest and the Wanganui Forest, in the North Island and the South Island, respectively, seedfall data show clear yearly fluctuations in seed production in studied specimens. A 1988 study proposes that a combination of low seed production and cool temperatures two years before, followed by warm temperatures during seedfall are necessary, but not solely responsible for triggering a mast year in the tree. The relationship between seed production in one year and conditions from two years earlier also plays an important role. Canham et al. 2014 analysed D. cupressinum specimens growing in less fertile marine terrace sites had a higher seed production rate in comparison to specimens that grew on more fertile alluvial soils. Researchers suggested that the tree has adapted to seed production in less fertile soils rather than being displaced by other species.

The growth rates of D. cupressinum can vary significantly, especially in the early growth stages. Height growth often occurs at the expense of diameter growth, with saplings limited to 10 cm (3.9 in) in diameter and reaching up to 12 m (39 ft) tall. In open conditions, annual increments can be 15–30 cm (5.9–11.8 in) in height and 1–3 cm (0.39–1.18 in) in diameter, but growth rate slows in shaded forest environments, with seedlings growing 1–2 cm (0.39–0.79 in) per year.

== Distribution ==
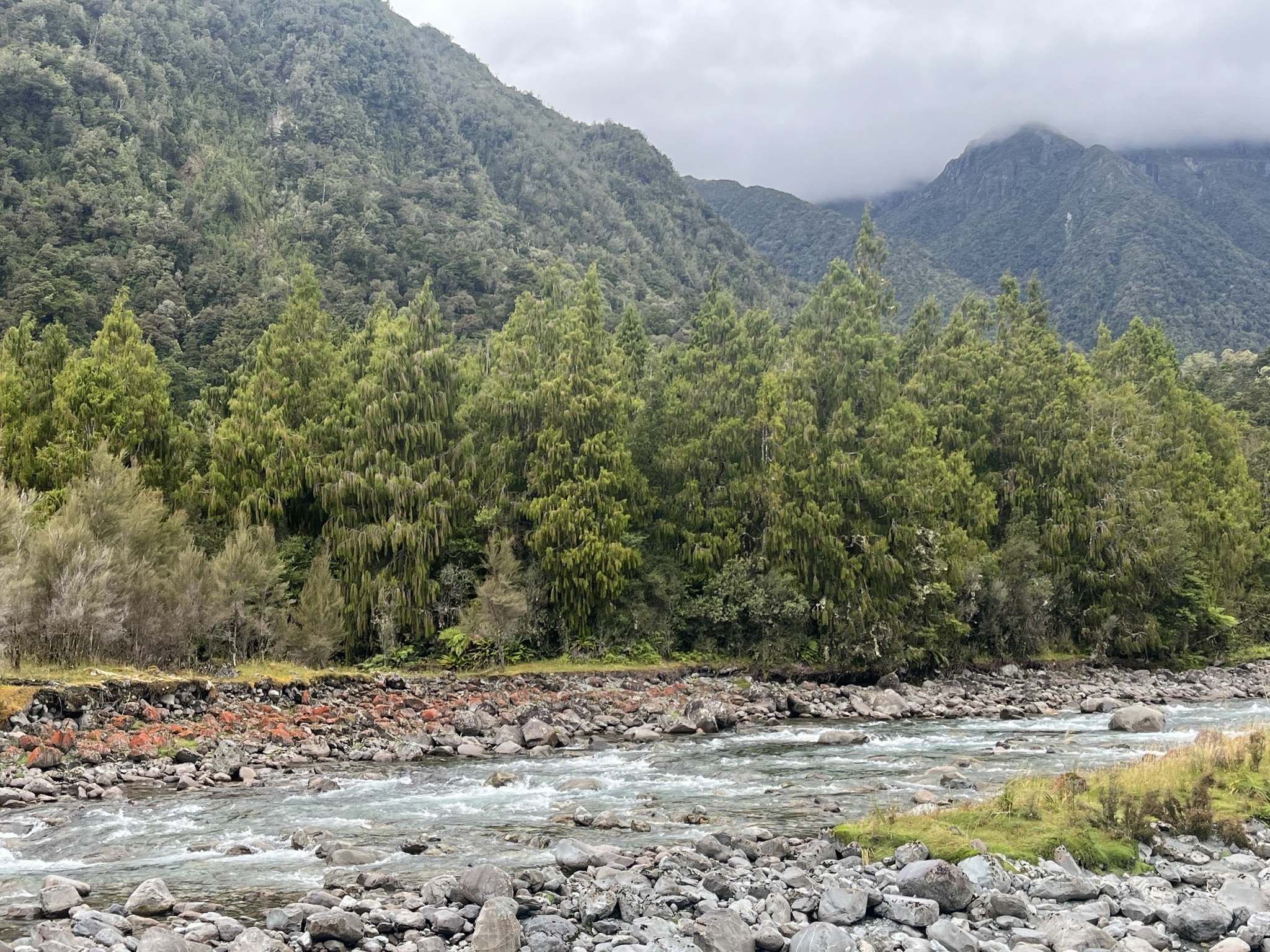
D. cupressinum, along with other predominantly conifer species, found along the banks of the Haupiri River in the South Island's West Coast Region

Dacrydium cupressinum is endemic to New Zealand, and is the country's most common native conifer. Its range covers the North Island, South Island, and Stewart Island. In the South Island, it is uncommon or absent in parts of the eastern side of the island. On the Banks Peninsula, it is almost entirely extinct, with its absence being attributed to deforestations instead of environmental changes, such as moisture deficits in summer. D. cupressinum was previously common around the Banks Peninsula town of Little River. In the South Island, D. cupressinum's range predominantly covers the west side of the island, and it is largely not present in: Canterbury, Marlborough, Otago, and more generally, the inland South Island.

Dacrydium cupressinum was likely naturally not present in only a few specific areas of the North Island prior to colonisation, which included: the eastern parts of Tongariro National Park, Kaingaroa Forest, and the southern parts of Hawke's Bay. On the eastern side of the South Island, the tree's presence is scattered, particularly in the areas in between Blenheim and Waikouaiti. The species does occur in small populations in the Ashley Forest, the Hunters Hills, the Kaikōura Ranges, and a few other localities.

=== Habitat ===
Dacrydium cupressinum typically inhabits lowland to montane forests, and is occasionally found near subalpine scrubland. The tree is a dominant or codominant tree in mixed conifer or conifer-angiosperm forests, reaching elevations of up to 700–950 m (2,300–3,120 ft) above sea level. Its lower elevation limits are 10 m (30 ft) above sea level. The tree is commonly associated with other conifers in its natural habitat, such as: kauri (Agathis australis) and tōtara (Podocarpus totara), as well as angiosperms, which could include: taraire (Beilschmiedia tarairi) and various Metrosideros species. D. cupressinum has a highly varied climatic range and can grow in most soil types, but it will grow faster in more fertile soils. In the West Coast Region, the tree grows in areas of heavy rainfall on boulder clay, and soils that are rich in humus. The seedlings of the tree also appear to have a preference for soils that are rich in humus and minerals. Unlike other members of the Dacrydium genus, D. cupressinum is the only member of the genus that is naturally found in a temperate climate.

== Uses ==
=== In European culture ===
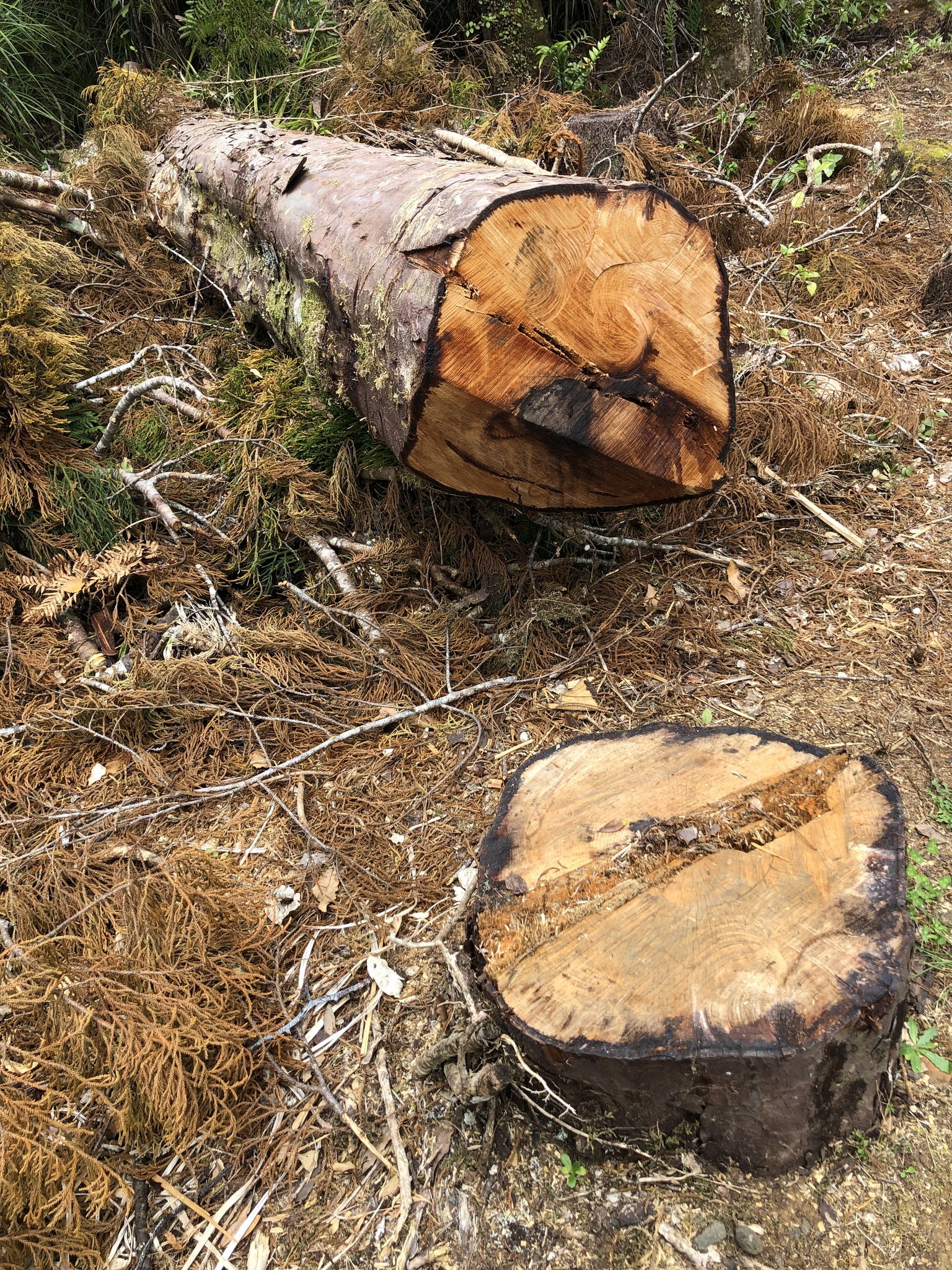
D. cupressinum was once the most harvested timber in New Zealand.

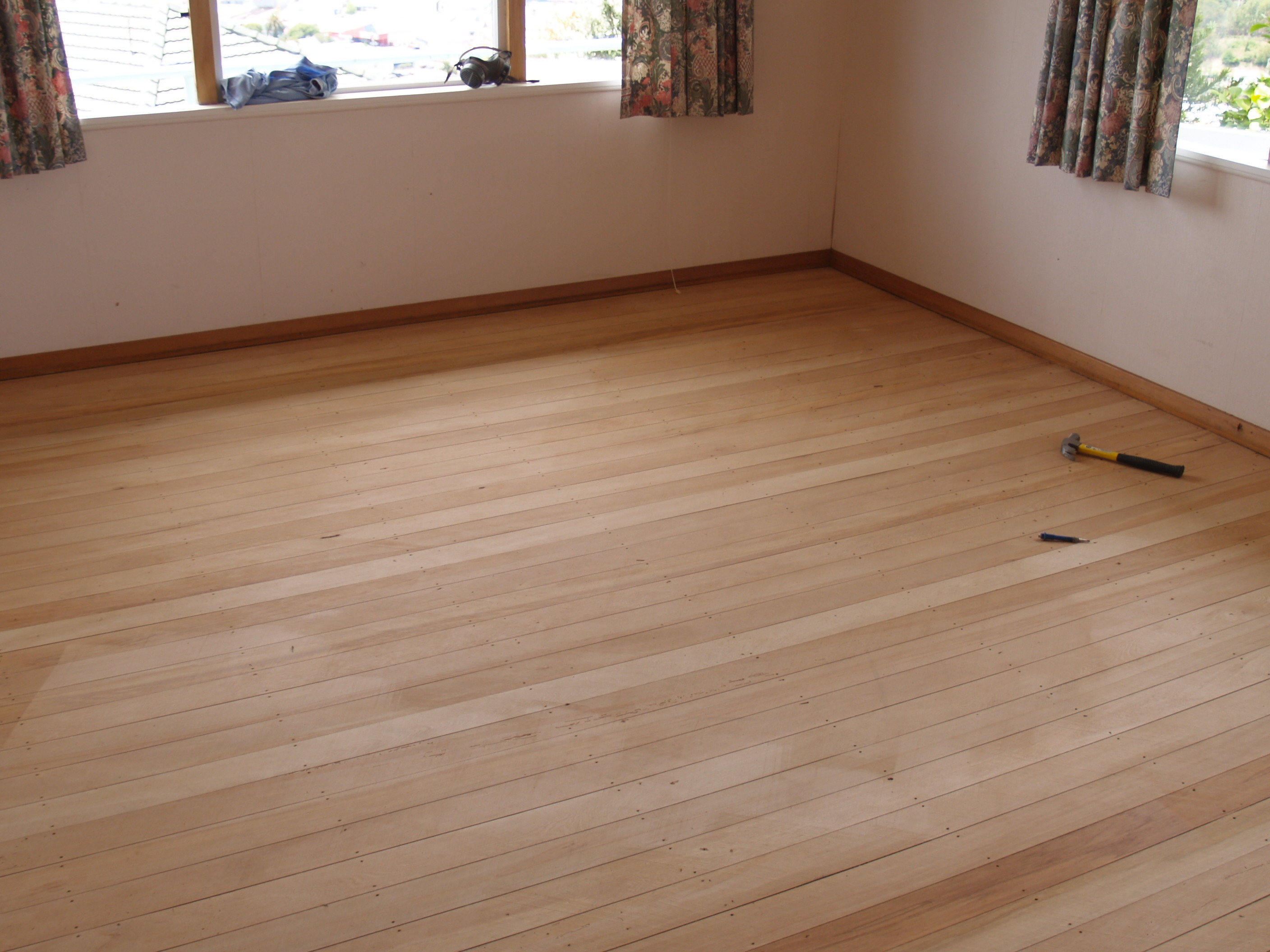
D. cupressinum was valued for its timber, shown here for flooring.

Dacrydium cupressinum has played a significant role in both the Māori and European cultures of New Zealand. In 1773, the British explorer, James Cook, brewed the first native beer at Tamatea / Dusky Sound, extracting the young tips of the branches of the tree to create what was known as "spruce beer". Cook's beer was an efficient source to prevent scurvy, a deficiency disease. The British missionary, Richard Taylor, in a book on the cultural and natural history of New Zealand plants published in 1848, described D. cupressinum's fruit as being prized by the natives and observed that infusions of its wood were used for making beer. He also noted that resin from the tree was "sweet and bitter".

The former vernacular name used by European settlers, the 'red pine', which refers to the deep red colour of the sap and wood of the tree, has since fallen out of common use.

Dacrydium cupressinum served as a significant source of timber in New Zealand, because the tree was present throughout many lowland parts of the country and the trees could grow to large sizes. D. cupressinum was once the most harvested timber in New Zealand, consisting of 58 percent of the country's total timber production between 1918 and 1930. The timber has been used for furniture making, and the interior panelling of trams and railway-cars. The timber has also been used for other miscellaneous purposes, such as ceiling bases, coffins, and picture-frames.

The timber has a uniform texture and it is very durable and resilient. In a 1931 revision of the tree's properties of the wood, it was called the "most important softwood in New Zealand". The timber was frequently chosen for decorative purposes; the timber merges the qualities of a textured hardwood with the moderate weight of a common softwood. D. cupressinum's primary roles as a timber include it being used for fencing, flooring, furniture making, wagon-building, and weatherboards. The heartwood is durable above ground, but the sapwood is prone to decaying in wet environments and vulnerable to infestations by beetles.

=== In Māori culture ===
... [this fruit] is much prized by the natives, the smallness of the size being made up by its abundance; this tree produces a resin which is both sweet and bitter; the wood, also, possesses the same qualities; an infusion might be used for beer.

— Richard Taylor, 1848

In Māori mythology, when the Polynesian explorer Kupe first discovered New Zealand, Nukutawhiti, an important ancestor, performed a ceremony when reaching land using the shoots from the tree in the presence of traditional Polynesian immortals, before people from his canoe could go ashore. D. cupressinum is of great importance to Māori, the indigenous people of New Zealand. The fruit is abundant during the fruiting season, and served as a significant food source to Māori. The Ngāpuhi people (tribe) used the timber for canoe-making (or waka). D. cupressinum was also used medicinally by Māori: its gum (or sap) was used as a styptic to stop bleeding from wounds; its bark was utilised for decoction to treat wounds, and the inner parts of the bark were crushed into a pulp to treat burns; and its leaves were used to treat sores. Māori have long seen the value of the timber for creating weapons. The British missionary, William Colenso, recorded that "long war spears" were made from the timber. The timber was also crafted into hunting spears.

There are some other more names that Māori have for specific parts of the tree; for example, the tree's heartwood is known as: kāpara, māpara, or ngāpara. The fruit is known as huarangi, and the seed inside the fruit was known as matawhanaunga. Another name some Māori used for the tree was puaka, which the ethnographer Elsdon Best documented as being used by the Te Arawa people (an iwi from the North Island).

== Conservation ==
Dacrydium cupressinum's conservation status was assessed by the IUCN Red List in 2013 as "Least Concern", and its population trend was assessed as "Stable". Its assessment in the New Zealand Threat Classification System was evaluated in 2023 as "Not Threatened". Although previously harvested for timber, D. cupressinum is now protected from logging under the Forests Act 1949, which was amended in 1993, and its natural regeneration is vigorous in locations with mature trees and is further supported by revegetation efforts. D. cupressinum timber is still produced, although in smaller amounts.

The current threats that the tree possesses are introduced species, such as deer and possums. A significant amount of lowland forests in New Zealand were historically cleared for agriculture, forestry, and urban growth over 150 years, ending around 1970. This has led to at least a 70 percent decline in the area occupied by the tree and other plant species, making the species eligible as "Endangered" under IUCN guidelines. However, some conservationists argue that threat assessments should focus on present and future conditions, making the classification controversial. Despite this, the 2013 classification on the ICUN Red List remains "Least Concern".

== See also ==
- List of trees native to New Zealand

== Works cited ==
Books

- Carrière, Élie-Abel (1855). Traité Général des Conifères [General Treatise on Conifers] (in French). Paris, France: [s.n.] doi:10.5962/bhl.title.17188.
- Dawson, John; Lucas, Rob; Connor, Jane; Brownsey, P. J. (2011). New Zealand's Native Trees. Nelson, New Zealand: Potton & Burton. ISBN 978-1-877517-01-3.
- Eckenwalder, James E. (2009). Conifers of the World. Portland, United States: Timber Press. ISBN 978-0-88192-974-4.
- Farjon, Aljos (2017). A Handbook of the World's Conifers. Vol. 2. Leiden, Netherlands & Boston, United States: Brill Publishers. ISBN 978-90-04-32451-0.
- Forster, Georg; Solander, Daniel (1786). De Plantis Esculentis Insularum Oceani Australis Commentatio Botanica [Botanical Commentary on the Edible Plants of the Islands of the Southern Ocean] (in Latin). Georg, Forster.
- Gledhill, David (2008). The Names of Plants. Cambridge, United Kingdom: Cambridge University Press. ISBN 978-0-521-68553-5.
- Kirk, Thomas (1889). The Forest Flora of New Zealand. Wellington, New Zealand: George Didsbury, Government Printer.
- Lambert, Aylmer Bourke; Don, David; Bauer, Ferdinand (1806). A Description of the Genus Pinus: Illustrated with Figures, Directions Relative to the Cultivation, and Remarks on the Uses of the Several Species. Vol. 1. London, United Kingdom: J. White. p. 93.
- Laing, R. M. (1906). Plants of New Zealand. Christchurch, New Zealand: Whitcombe and Tombs.
- Linné, Carl von; Sprengel, Kurt Polycarp Joachim; Sprengel, Anton (1826). Systema Vegetabilium [Plant System] (in Latin). Vol. 3. Göttingen, Germany: sumtibus Librariae Dieterichianae. p. 890.
- Mirza, Umair (2005). New Zealand Encyclopedia (6th ed.). Auckland, New Zealand: David Bateman. ISBN 978-1-86953-601-5.
- Taylor, Richard (1848). A Leaf from the Natural History of New Zealand or, a Vocabulary of its Different Productions &c. [et cetra], with their native names. Wellington, New Zealand: Robert Stokes.
- Vennell, Robert (2019). The Meaning of Trees. Auckland, New Zealand: HarperCollins. ISBN 978-1-77554-130-1.
- Ward, W. C. (1931). The Properties and Uses of Rimu (Dacrydium cupressinum). Wellington, New Zealand: New Zealand State Forest Service.
- Wardle, J. (2011). Wardle's Native Plants of New Zealand and Their Story. Bateson Publishing Limited. ISBN 9781877520068.

Journals

- Berry, Katherine M.; Perry, Nigel B.; Weavers, Rex T. (1985). "Foliage Sesquiterpenes of Dacrydium cupressinum: Identification, Variation and Biosynthesis". Phytochemistry. 24 (12): 2893–2898. doi:10.1016/0031-9422(85)80022-4. ISSN 0031-9422.
- Best, Eldson (1907). "Maori Forest Lore: Being some Account of Native Forest Lore and Woodcraft, as also of many Myths, Rites, Customs, and Superstitions connected with the Flora and Fauna of the Tuhoe or Ure-wera District". Transactions and Proceedings of the Royal Society of New Zealand. 40: 180–200. ISSN 0035-9181. Archived from the original on 14 December 2024.
- Beveridge, A. E. (1964). "Animal Modification of Native Vegetation: Dispersal and Destruction of Seed in central North Island Podocarp Forests". Proceedings of the New Zealand Ecological Society. 11 (48–56). ISSN 0110-6465.
- Biggs, Bruce (1957). "The Story of Kupe. As Written Down by Himiona Kaamira". The Journal of the Polynesian Society. 66 (3). The Polynesian Society: 232–248. ISSN 0032-4000. JSTOR 20703617.
- Canham, Charles D.; Ruscoe, Wendy A.; Wright, Elaine F.; Wilson, Deborah J. (2014). "Spatial and temporal variation in tree seed production and dispersal in a New Zealand temperate rainforest". Ecosphere. 5 (4): 1–14. doi:10.1890/ES13-00384.1. ISSN 2150-8925.
- Chatterton, J; Pas, A; Alexander, S; Leech, M; Jakob-Hoff, R; Jensen, Bp; Digby, A (2017). "Concentrations of Calcium and 25-hydroxycholecalciferol (Vitamin D 3) in Plasma of Wild Kākāpō (Strigops habroptilus) Living on Two Islands in New Zealand". New Zealand Veterinary Journal. 65 (4): 198–203. doi:10.1080/00480169.2017.1314795. ISSN 0048-0169.
- Colenso, William (1868). "Essay on the Botany, Geographic and Œconomic [sic], of the North Island of the New Zealand Group". Transactions and Proceedings of the Royal Society of New Zealand. 1: 31. ISSN 0035-9181. Archived from the original on 3 July 2022.
- Franklin, D. A. (1968). "Biological Flora of New Zealand: 3. Dacrydium cupressinum Lamb. (Podocarpaceae) Rimu". New Zealand Journal of Botany. 6 (4): 493–513. doi:10.1080/0028825X.1968.10428587. ISSN 0028-825X.
- Hinkley, Simon F.R.; Perry, Nigel B.; Weavers, Rex T. (1994). "Confirmation of Structure and Absolute Stereochemistry of 9-epi-β-caryophyllene from Dacrydium cupressinum". Phytochemistry. 35 (6): 1489–1494. doi:10.1016/S0031-9422(00)86882-X. ISSN 0031-9422.
- Hood, Ian (2012). "Fungi Decaying Fallen Stems of Rimu (Dacrydium cupressinum, Podocarpaceae) in Southern Westland, New Zealand". New Zealand Journal of Botany. 50 (1): 59–69. doi:10.1080/0028825X.2011.643474. ISSN 0028-825X.
- Hutchison, F. E. (1932). "The Life History of the Westland Rimu Stands". New Zealand Journal of Forestry. 3 (3). ISSN 1174-7986.
- James, Ian L.; Norton, David A. (2002). "Helicopter-Based Natural Forest Management for New Zealand's Rimu (Dacrydium cupressinum, Podocarpaceae) Forests". Forest Ecology and Management. 155 (1–3): 337–346. doi:10.1016/S0378-1127(01)00570-9. ISSN 0378-1127.
- Joshee, Sucheta; Paulus, Barbara C.; Park, Duckchul; Johnston, Peter R. (2009). "Diversity and Distribution of Fungal Foliar Endophytes in New Zealand Podocarpaceae". Mycological Research. 113 (9). Elsevier BV: 1003–1015. doi:10.1016/j.mycres.2009.06.004. ISSN 0953-7562.
- Kelch, Dean G. (1998). "Phylogeny of Podocarpaceae: Comparison of Evidence from Morphology and 18s rDNA". American Journal of Botany. 85 (7): 986–996. doi:10.2307/2446365. ISSN 0002-9122.
- Khan, Raees; Hill, Robert S.; Liu, Jie; Biffin, Ed (2023). "Diversity, Distribution, Systematics and Conservation Status of Podocarpaceae". Plants. 12 (5): 1171. doi:10.3390/plants12051171. ISSN 2223-7747.
- Markham, Kenneth R.; Webby, Rosemary F.; Molloy, Brian P. J.; Vilain, Christian (1988). "Support from Flavonoid Glycoside Distribution for the Division of Dacrydium Sensu Lato". New Zealand Journal of Botany. 27 (1): 1–11. doi:10.1080/0028825X.1989.10410139. ISSN 0028-825X.
- Marshall, Grace R.; Wyse, Sarah V.; Manley, Bruce R.; Forbes, Adam S. (2023). "International Use of Exotic Plantations for Native Forest Restoration and Implications for Aotearoa New Zealand". New Zealand Journal of Ecology. 47 (1). New Zealand Ecological Society. ISSN 0110-6465. JSTOR 48740238.
- Morgan, F. David (1960). "Two Beetles from the Bark Scales of Rimu (Dacrydium cupressinum Soland.)". New Zealand Entomologist. 2 (5): 24–25. doi:10.1080/00779962.1960.9722790. ISSN 0077-9962.
- Morley, Robert J. (2011). "Dispersal and Paleoecology of Tropical Podocarps". Smithsonian Contributions to Botany (95): 21–41. doi:10.5479/si.0081024X.95.21.
- Norton, D. A.; Herbert, J. W.; Beveridge, A. E. (1988). "The Ecology of Dacrydium cupressinum: A Review". New Zealand Journal of Botany. 26 (1): 37–62. doi:10.1080/0028825X.1988.10410098. ISSN 0028-825X.
- Norton, D. A.; Kelly, D. (1988). "Mast Seeding Over 33 Years by Dacrydium cupressinum Lamb. (Rimu) (Podocarpaceae) in New Zealand: The Importance of Economies of Scale". Functional Ecology. 2 (3): 399. doi:10.2307/2389413. ISSN 1365-2435.
- Oliver, W. R. B. (1930). "New Zealand Epiphytes". The Journal of Ecology. 18 (1): 1. doi:10.2307/2255890. ISSN 1365-2745.
- Perry, Nigel B.; Weavers, Rex T. (1985). "Infraspecific Variation of Foliage Diterpenes of Dacrydium cupressinum". Phytochemistry. 24 (10). Elsevier BV: 2233–2237. doi:10.1016/s0031-9422(00)83016-2. ISSN 0031-9422.
- Stull, Gregory W.; Qu, Xiao-Jian; Parins-Fukuchi, Caroline; Yang, Ying-Ying; Yang, Jun-Bo; Yang, Zhi-Yun; Hu, Yi; Ma, Hong; Soltis, Pamela S.; Soltis, Douglas E.; Li, De-Zhu; Smith, Stephen A.; Yi, Ting-Shuang (2021). "Gene Duplications and Phylogenomic Conflict Underlie Major Pulses of Phenotypic Evolution in Gymnosperms". Nature. 7 (8): 1015–1025. doi:10.1038/s41477-021-00964-4. ISSN 2055-0278.
- Von Hurst, P.R.; Moorhouse, R.J.; Raubenheimer, D. (2016). "Preferred Natural Food of Breeding Kakapo [sic] is a High Value Source of Calcium and Vitamin D". The Journal of Steroid Biochemistry and Molecular Biology. 164: 177–179. doi:10.1016/j.jsbmb.2015.10.017. ISSN 0960-0760.
- Warburton, B.; Kingsford, S.J.; Lewitt, D.W; Spurr, E.B. (1992). "Plant Species Preferences of Birds in Lowland Rimu (Dacrydium cupressinum) Forest – Implications for Selective-logging". New Zealand Journal of Ecology. 16 (2). New Zealand Ecological Society: 119–126. ISSN 0110-6465. JSTOR 24053606.
- Wyse, Sarah V.; Perry, George L. W.; O'Connell, Dean M.; Holland, Phillip S.; Wright, Monique J.; Hosted, Catherine L.; Whitelock, Samuel L.; Geary, Ian J.; Maurin, Kévin J. L.; Curran, Timothy J. (2016). "A Quantitative Assessment of Shoot Flammability for 60 Tree and Shrub Species Supports Rankings Based on Expert Opinion". International Journal of Wildland Fire. 25 (4): 466. doi:10.1071/WF15047. hdl:10182/6884. ISSN 1049-8001.

Websites

- De Lange, Peter (2025). "Dacrydium cupressinum". New Zealand Plant Conservation Network. Archived from the original on 28 January 2025.
- Swarbrick, Nancy (2007). "Logging native forests". Te Ara: The Encyclopedia of New Zealand. Archived from the original on 15 May 2025.
- Thomas, P. (2013). "Dacrydium cupressinum". IUCN Red List of Threatened Species. 2013 e.T42448A2981038. doi:10.2305/IUCN.UK.2013-1.RLTS.T42448A2981038.en.
- "Dacrydium cupressinum Sol. ex Lamb., Descr. Pinus [Lambert] 1(2): 93, t. 41 (1806)". The Royal Botanic Gardens, Kew, Harvard University Herbaria & Libraries and Australian National Herbarium. International Plant Names Index. 2025. Archived from the original on 2 August 2024.
- "Dacrydium cupressinum Sol. ex G.Forst". Plants of the World Online. 2025. Archived from the original on 2 December 2024.
- "Ngā Rauropi Whakaoranga — Dacrydium cupressinum. Rimu". Manaaki Whenua – Landcare Research. 2020. Archived from the original on 30 January 2025.
