= Podocarpus borneensis =

Conservation status
- Least Concern (IUCN 3.1)

Scientific classification
- Kingdom: Plantae
- Clade: Tracheophytes
- Clade: Gymnosperms
- Division: Pinophyta
- Class: Pinopsida
- Order: Araucariales
- Family: Podocarpaceae
- Genus: Podocarpus
- Species: P. borneensis

Binomial name
- Podocarpus borneensis de Laub.

Synonyms
- Podocarpus polystachyus var. rigidus Wasscher

Species of conifer

Podocarpus borneensis is a species of conifer in the family Podocarpaceae. It is native to the island of Borneo, which is divided between Indonesia and Malaysia.

It grows primarily in montane rain forests between 700 and 2,100 meters elevation, often on rocky or exposed ridges where it is a small or stunted tree. It is also found scattered in closed-canopy forests, where it can reach 20 meters or more in height. On the sandstone Merurong Plateau it can be the dominant tree, or mixed with other conifers (species of Agathis, Dacrydium, Dacrycarpus, Podocarpus, and Phyllocladus) and flowering trees and shrubs. It is occasionally found at lower elevations, including in kerangas forests on infertile sand, and at least one peat swamp forest site.
