= Podocarpus gibbsiae =

Conservation status
- Vulnerable (IUCN 3.1)

Scientific classification
- Kingdom: Plantae
- Clade: Tracheophytes
- Clade: Gymnosperms
- Division: Pinophyta
- Class: Pinopsida
- Order: Araucariales
- Family: Podocarpaceae
- Genus: Podocarpus
- Species: P. gibbsiae

Binomial name
- Podocarpus gibbsiae N.E.Gray

Species of conifer

Podocarpus gibbsiae is a species of conifer in the family Podocarpaceae. It is endemic to Mount Kinabalu on the island of Borneo, in the Sabah state of Malaysia. It grows in montane mossy forests in the cloud forest belt from 1,200 to 2,400 metres elevation. It is confined to ultramafic soil derived from serpentinite and similar rocks. These forests have an open canopy 20 to 25 meters high composed of flowering and coniferous trees, including the conifers Phyllocladus hypophyllus and Dacrydium gibbsiae, which are covered with abundant epiphytes including lichens, mosses, ferns, and orchids.

It is threatened by habitat loss, and assessed as Vulnerable by the IUCN.
