= Podocarpus salomoniensis =

Conservation status
- Near Threatened (IUCN 3.1)

Scientific classification
- Kingdom: Plantae
- Clade: Tracheophytes
- Clade: Gymnosperms
- Division: Pinophyta
- Class: Pinopsida
- Order: Araucariales
- Family: Podocarpaceae
- Genus: Podocarpus
- Species: P. salomoniensis

Binomial name
- Podocarpus salomoniensis Wasscher

Species of conifer

Podocarpus salomoniensis is a species of conifer in the family Podocarpaceae. It is a tree endemic to the Solomon Islands. It is known from Makira (aka San Cristobal Island), where the type specimen was collected at Hinuahaoro, and from San Jorge Island and Choiseul. Its distribution is not well understood and it may occur on other islands in the Solomon archipelago. It grows in lowland rain forest, often on steep slopes, and also in Casuarina-dominated swamp forest from near sea level up to 900 metres elevation. On Choiseul it was recorded growing with Dacrydium xanthandrum, Gymnostoma sp., and Metroxylon salomonense.

The species was described by Jacob Wasscher in 1941.
