= Dacrydium spathoides =

Conservation status
- Near Threatened (IUCN 3.1)

Scientific classification
- Kingdom: Plantae
- Clade: Tracheophytes
- Clade: Gymnosperms
- Division: Pinophyta
- Class: Pinopsida
- Order: Araucariales
- Family: Podocarpaceae
- Genus: Dacrydium
- Species: D. spathoides

Binomial name
- Dacrydium spathoides de Laub.

Synonyms
- Corneria spathoides (de Laub.) A.V.Bobrov & Melikyan

Species of conifer

Dacrydium spathoides is a species of conifer in the family Podocarpaceae. It is found only in a small area of the Central Highlands of Western New Guinea (Papua).
