= Dacrydium leptophyllum =

Conservation status
- Vulnerable (IUCN 3.1)

Scientific classification
- Kingdom: Plantae
- Clade: Tracheophytes
- Clade: Gymnosperms
- Division: Pinophyta
- Class: Pinopsida
- Order: Araucariales
- Family: Podocarpaceae
- Genus: Dacrydium
- Species: D. leptophyllum

Binomial name
- Dacrydium leptophyllum (Wasschler) de Laub.

Synonyms
- Bracteocarpus leptophyllus (Wasscher) A.V.Bobrov & Melikyan; Corneria leptophylla (Wasscher) A.V.Bobrov & Melikyan; Dacrycarpus leptophyllus (Wasscher) Gaussen, no basionym stated.; Podocarpus leptophyllus Wasscher

Species of conifer

Dacrydium leptophyllum is a species of conifer in the family Podocarpaceae. It is a tree endemic to New Guinea. It is known only from Mount Goliath in the Central Highlands of Western New Guinea, where it grows in high-elevation mossy forest above 3,000 metres elevation.
