= Dacrydium guillauminii =

Conservation status
- Critically Endangered (IUCN 3.1)

Scientific classification
- Kingdom: Plantae
- Clade: Tracheophytes
- Clade: Gymnosperms
- Division: Pinophyta
- Class: Pinopsida
- Order: Araucariales
- Family: Podocarpaceae
- Genus: Dacrydium
- Species: D. guillauminii

Binomial name
- Dacrydium guillauminii J.Buchholz

Species of conifer

Dacrydium guillauminii, the cat-tail Rimu or swamp Dacrydium, is a species of conifer in the family Podocarpaceae. It is endemic to New Caledonia. It is a slow growing shrub or small tree with roots that grow in water, and reaches a height between 1 and 2 metres.

The species occurs on the banks of rivers and lakes in the south of Grand Terre, the largest island of New Caledonia. It is threatened by wildfires and habitat destruction. Its name honors the French botanist André Guillaumin, who spearheaded the study of the flora of New Caledonia.

== Description ==
Dacrydium guillauminii is a shrub that grows to a height of around 2 m (7 ft) which forms an erect, densely branched bush. The bark is brown and fibrous, covered with small scales and lenticels when young, and developing many small cracks and crevices as it grows older. The leaves are needle-like with sharp points, overlapping and slightly compressed, and 13 to 17 mm (0.51 to 0.67 in) long. The male cones may be apical or axillary, the latter being considerably smaller than the terminal ones, which can be 8 to 14 mm (0.31 to 0.55 in) long. The female cones grow at the tips of the twigs or sometimes on short lateral twigs, and may each contain up to five seeds.

== Distribution and habitat ==
Dacrydium guillauminii is endemic to New Caledonia where it occurs in the southeast of the country. Its range is restricted to a small area around Rivière des Lacs, Lac en Huit, Lac Intermédaire and Grand Lacs, where it grows on the margins of streams and lakes. Its total area of occupation is about 12 km^{2} (5 mi^{2}), and there are thought to be fewer than one hundred mature plants.

== Status ==
In its habitat beside watercourses, this shrub often grows in association with Retrophyllum minus and Callitris pancheri, two other endangered conifers endemic to New Caledonia, and it sometimes hybridises with Dacrydium araucarioides. The area where they live is prone to wildfires, which kill the shrubs and trees, and part of the area has been inundated as a result of the filling of a reservoir. With its habitat being degraded and the number of mature plants in decline, the International Union for Conservation of Nature has assessed the conservation status of Dacrydium guillauminii as being "critically endangered".
