= Dacrydium ericoides =

Conservation status
- Least Concern (IUCN 3.1)

Scientific classification
- Kingdom: Plantae
- Clade: Embryophytes
- Clade: Tracheophytes
- Clade: Gymnosperms
- Division: Pinophyta
- Class: Pinopsida
- Order: Araucariales
- Family: Podocarpaceae
- Genus: Dacrydium
- Species: D. ericoides

Binomial name
- Dacrydium ericoides de Laub.

Synonyms
- Corneria ericoides (de Laub.) A.V.Bobrov & Melikyan

Species of conifer

Dacrydium ericoides is a species of conifer in the family Podocarpaceae which is endemic to Sarawak, on Borneo. It is threatened by habitat loss.

It is locally common in primary montane rain forest, aka cloud forest or mossy forest, on exposed ridges from 1,000 to 2,200 meters elevation, including Mount Dulit, Bukit Lawi, Bukit Skelap, Gunung Mulu, and Gunung Murud. It appears to be confined to ultrabasic soils.
