= Dacrydium cornwallianum =

Conservation status
- Least Concern (IUCN 3.1)

Scientific classification
- Kingdom: Plantae
- Clade: Tracheophytes
- Clade: Gymnospermae
- Division: Pinophyta
- Class: Pinopsida
- Order: Araucariales
- Family: Podocarpaceae
- Genus: Dacrydium
- Species: D. cornwallianum

Binomial name
- Dacrydium cornwallianum de Laub.

Synonyms
- Corneria cornwalliana (de Laub.) A.V.Bobrov & Melikyan; Dacrydium nidulum var. araucarioides de Laub.

Species of conifer

Dacrydium cornwallianum is a species of conifer in the family Podocarpaceae. It is a tree endemic to the island of New Guinea, which is politically divided between Indonesia and Papua New Guinea.

The species was first described by David John de Laubenfels in 1988.
