= D. magnum =

D. magnum may refer to:

- Dacrydium magnum, a conifer species found in Indonesia and Papua New Guinea
- Dendrochilum magnum, an orchid species

== See also ==
- Magnum (disambiguation)
