= Podocarpus laubenfelsii =

Conservation status
- Endangered (IUCN 3.1)

Scientific classification
- Kingdom: Plantae
- Clade: Tracheophytes
- Clade: Gymnosperms
- Division: Pinophyta
- Class: Pinopsida
- Order: Araucariales
- Family: Podocarpaceae
- Genus: Podocarpus
- Species: P. laubenfelsii

Binomial name
- Podocarpus laubenfelsii Tiong

Species of conifer

Podocarpus laubenfelsii is a species of conifer in the family Podocarpaceae. It is endemic to Borneo.

This plant grows in four known locations between 920 and 1,650 metres elevation, and there are few mature trees in any subpopulation. It grows in kerangas forest on nutrient-poor and waterlogged soils alongside Agathis borneensis, Nageia wallichiana, Sundacarpus amarus, Dacrydium gracile, and Falcatifolium falciforme. It also grows scattered in montane primary rainforest and montane mossy forest.

The species can grow quite large and is harvested for its valuable wood.
