= Dacrydium medium =

Conservation status
- Vulnerable (IUCN 3.1)

Scientific classification
- Kingdom: Plantae
- Clade: Tracheophytes
- Clade: Gymnosperms
- Division: Pinophyta
- Class: Pinopsida
- Order: Araucariales
- Family: Podocarpaceae
- Genus: Dacrydium
- Species: D. medium

Binomial name
- Dacrydium medium de Laub.

Synonyms
- Corneria media (de Laub.) A.V.Bobrov & Melikyan

Species of conifer

Dacrydium medium is a species of conifer in the family Podocarpaceae. It is a shrub or small tree native to Peninsular Malaysia and northern Sumatra. It grows mostly on ridges and summits on shallow and rocky soils that won't support forests, where low shrubby species of family Myrtaceae, including Baeckea and Leptospermum, are predominant. D. medium is most commonly a shrub or a small tree that rises above the surrounding shrub vegetation. Scattered individuals in the surrounding montane rain forest can grow as taller trees.

The species was first described by David John de Laubenfels in 1976.
