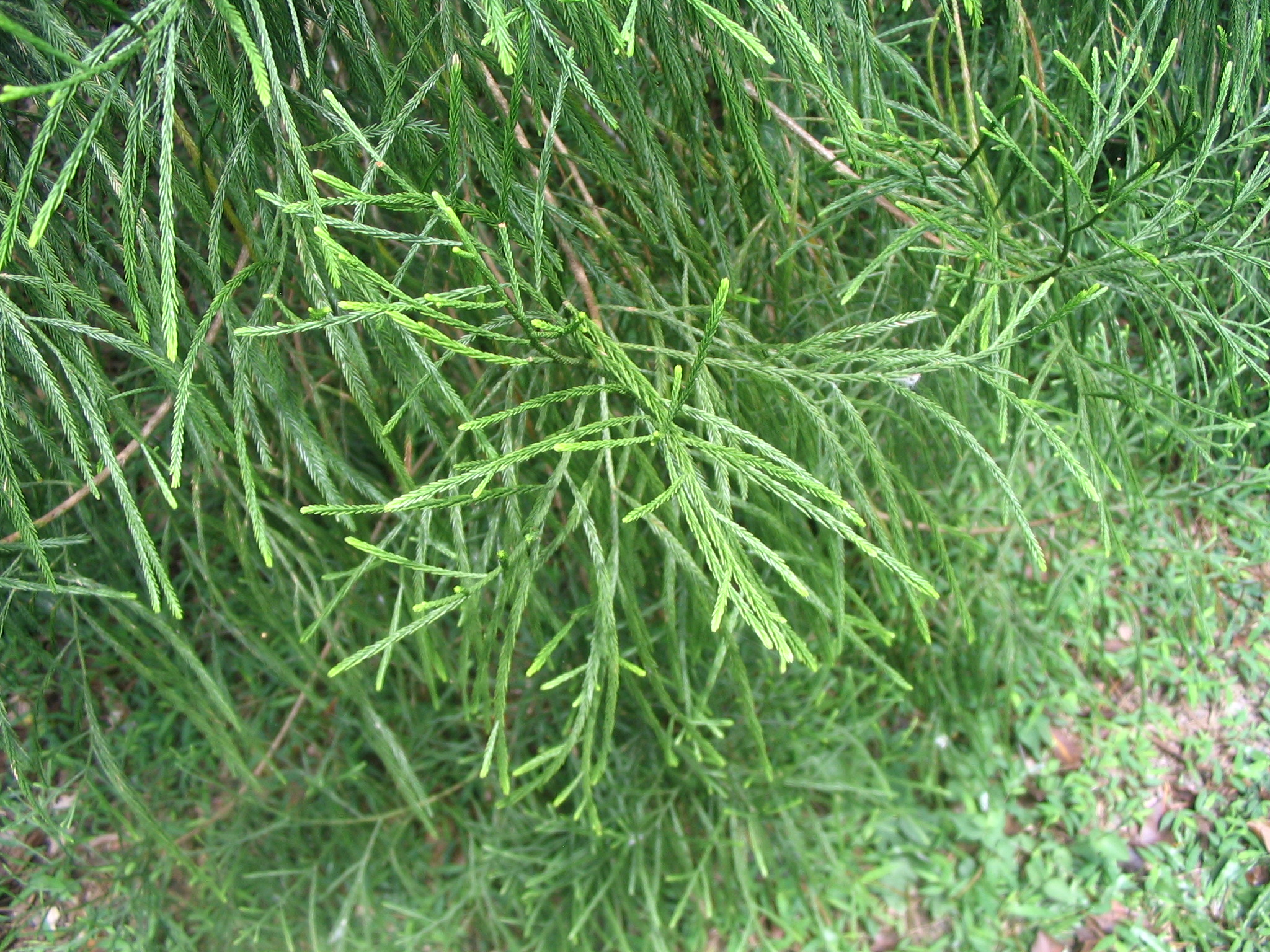

Conservation status
- Least Concern (IUCN 3.1)

Scientific classification
- Kingdom: Plantae
- Clade: Tracheophytes
- Clade: Gymnospermae
- Division: Pinophyta
- Class: Pinopsida
- Order: Araucariales
- Family: Podocarpaceae
- Genus: Dacrydium
- Species: D. beccarii

Binomial name
- Dacrydium beccarii Parl.

Synonyms
- Nageia beccarii (Parl.) Gordon

= Dacrydium beccarii =

Species of conifer

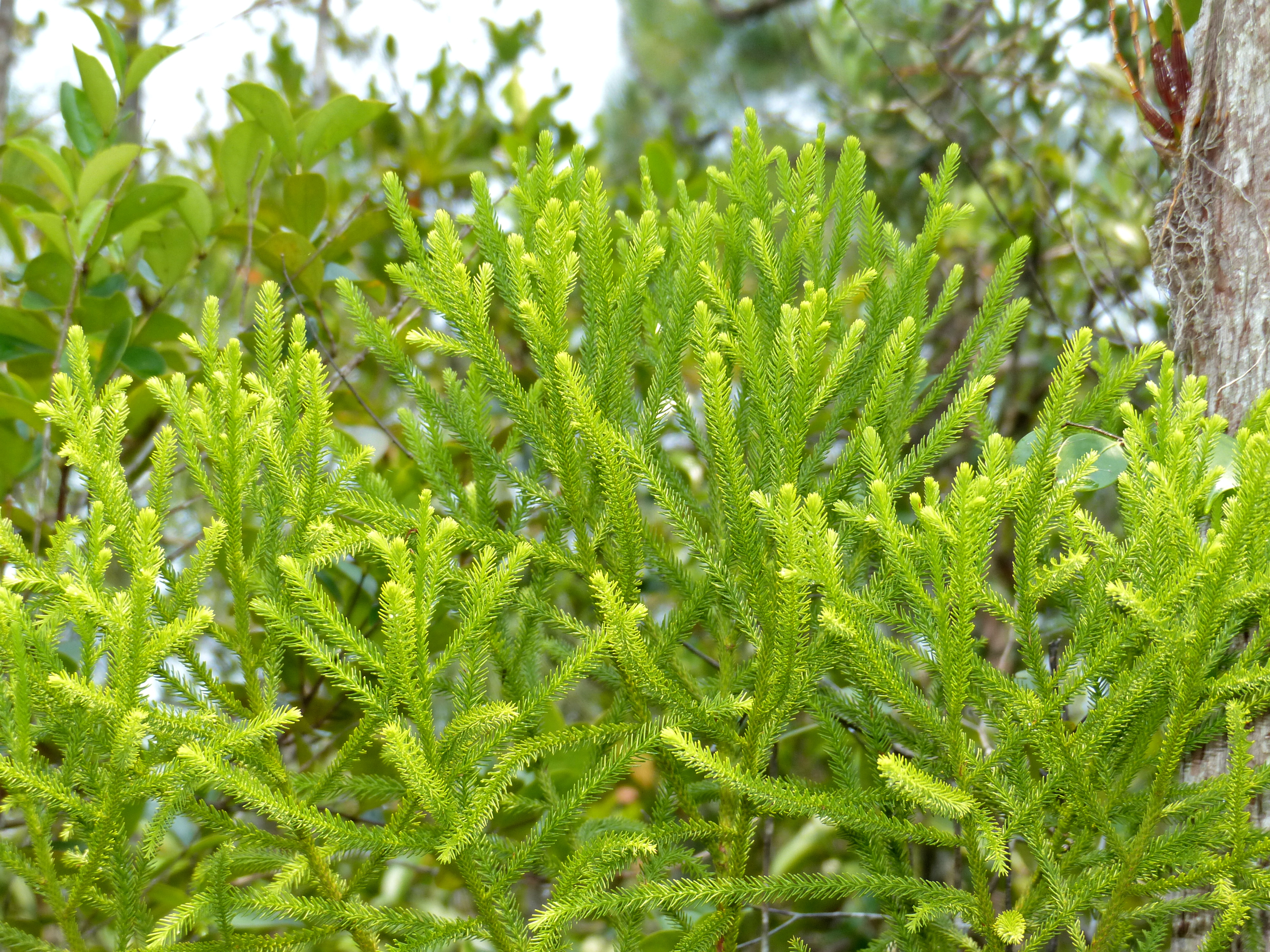
Dacrydium beccarii juvenile foliage

Dacrydium beccarii is a species of conifer in the family Podocarpaceae. It is a tree native to Indonesia (Borneo, Sumatra, Sulawesi, the Maluku Islands, and Western New Guinea), Malaysia (Peninsular Malaysia and Malaysian Borneo), Papua New Guinea (eastern New Guinea and the Bismarck Archipelago), the Philippines, and the Solomon Islands.

Dacrydium beccarii grows in submontane and montane rain forests from 500 to 2,500 metres elevation. It is often found growing on poor soils where it can better compete with broadleaved trees. It is common in the low canopy of submontane and montane mossy forest on leached podzolic sandy soils (kerangas) where it forms a low canopy up to 20 metres tall, and on exposed ridges and mountain summits where it is an emergent tree above dense broadleaved scrub. It is associated with other conifers including Agathis spp., Dacrycarpus spp., Falcatifolium gruezoi (including Mount Halcon in the Philippines), Nageia wallichiana, and sometimes Sundacarpus amarus.

The species was described by Filippo Parlatore in 1868.
