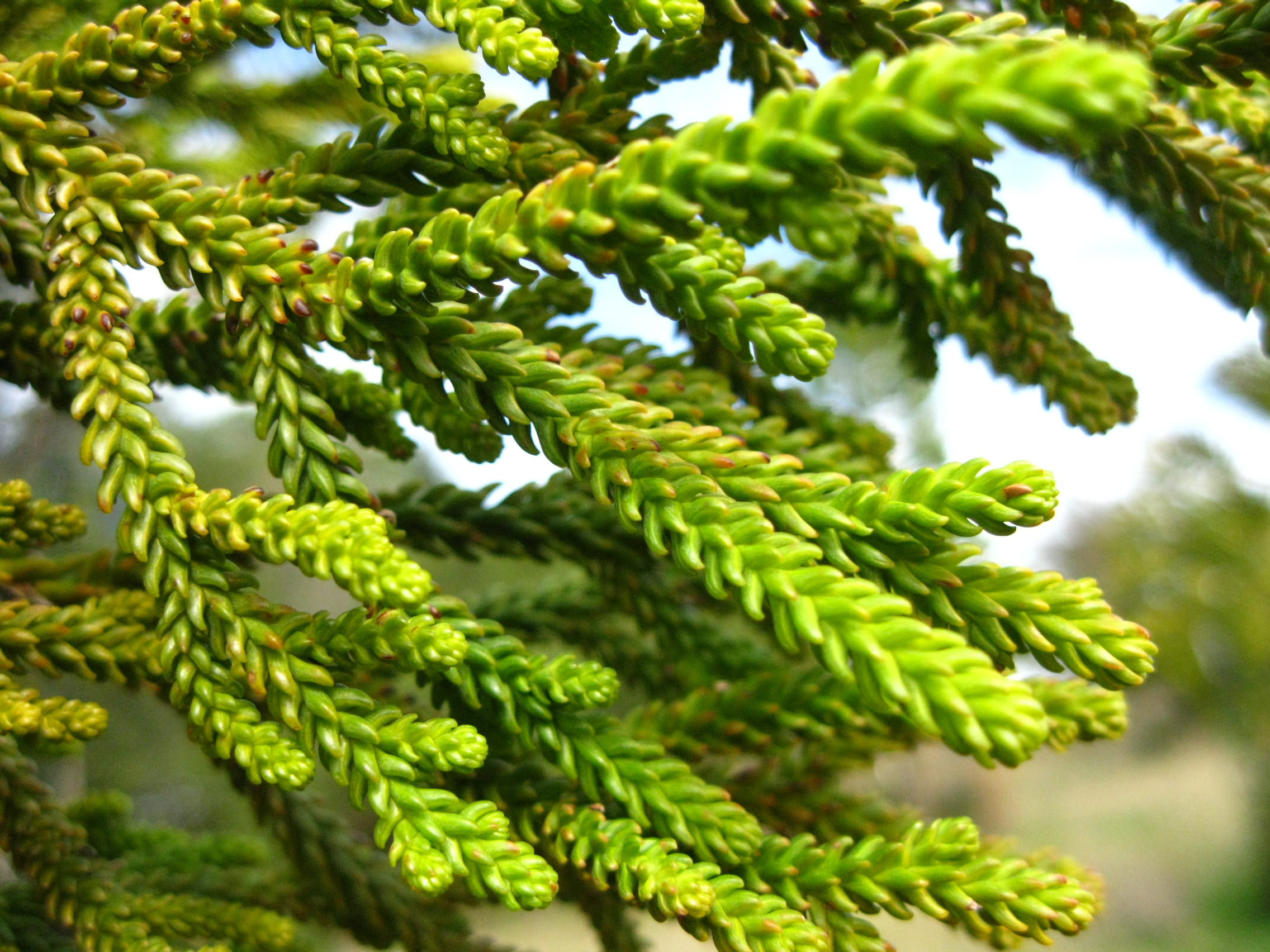

Conservation status
- Least Concern (IUCN 3.1)

Scientific classification
- Kingdom: Plantae
- Clade: Embryophytes
- Clade: Tracheophytes
- Clade: Gymnosperms
- Division: Pinophyta
- Class: Pinopsida
- Order: Araucariales
- Family: Podocarpaceae
- Genus: Dacrydium
- Species: D. balansae

Binomial name
- Dacrydium balansae Brongn. & Gris

Synonyms
- Metadacrydium balansae (Brongn. & Gris) Baum.-Bod.; Metadacrydium balansae (Brongn. & Gris) Baum.-Bod. ex Melikyan & A.V.Bobrov

= Dacrydium balansae =

Species of conifer

Dacrydium balansae is a species of conifer in the family Podocarpaceae. It is endemic to New Caledonia.
