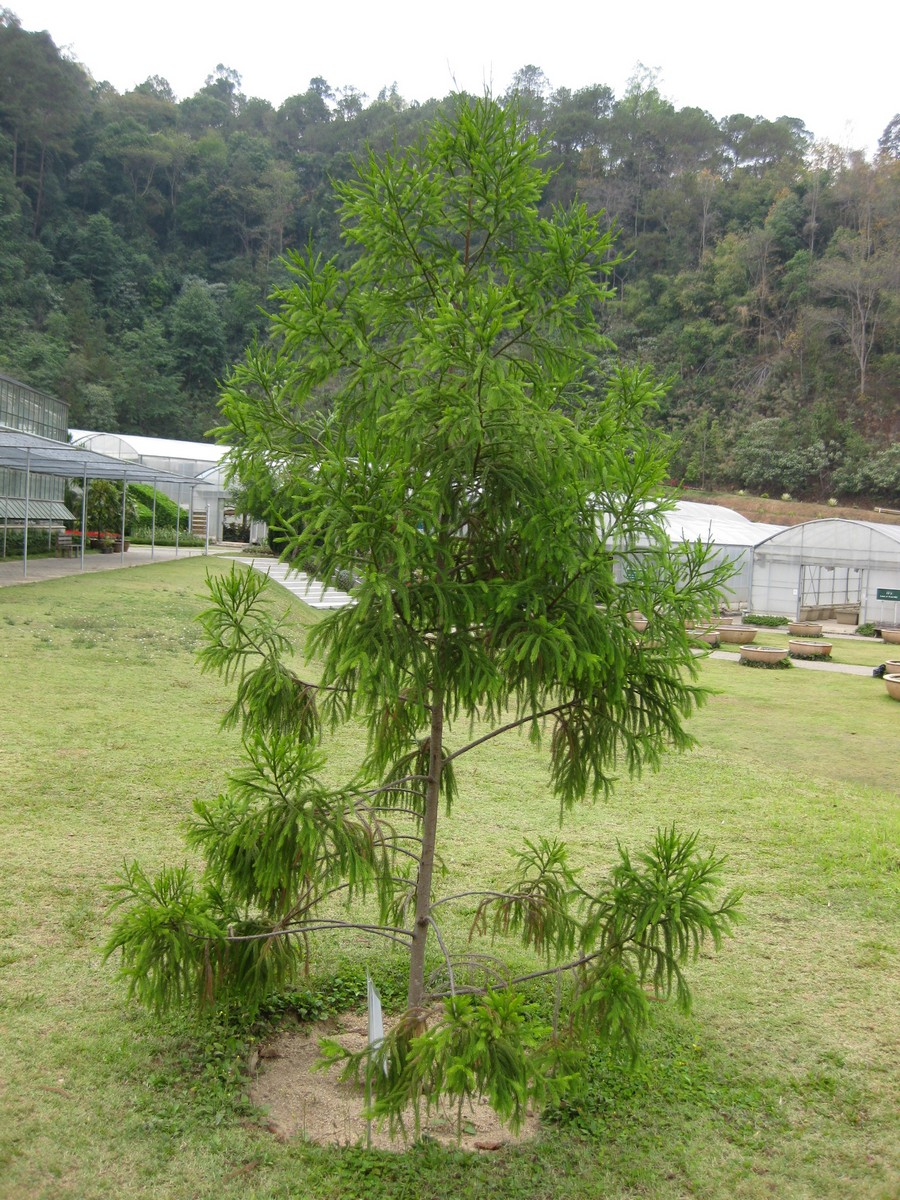

Conservation status
- Least Concern (IUCN 3.1)

Scientific classification
- Kingdom: Plantae
- Clade: Tracheophytes
- Clade: Gymnosperms
- Division: Pinophyta
- Class: Pinopsida
- Order: Araucariales
- Family: Podocarpaceae
- Genus: Dacrydium
- Species: D. elatum

Binomial name
- Dacrydium elatum Roxb. Wall. ex Hook.

Synonyms
- Corneria elata (Roxb.) A.V.Bobrov & Melikyan; Corneria pierrei (Hickel) A.V.Bobrov & Melikyan; Dacrydium junghuhnii Miq.; Dacrydium pierrei Hickel; Juniperus elata Roxb.; Juniperus elatus Roxb.; Juniperus philippsiana Wall. ex Carrière

= Dacrydium elatum =

Species of conifer

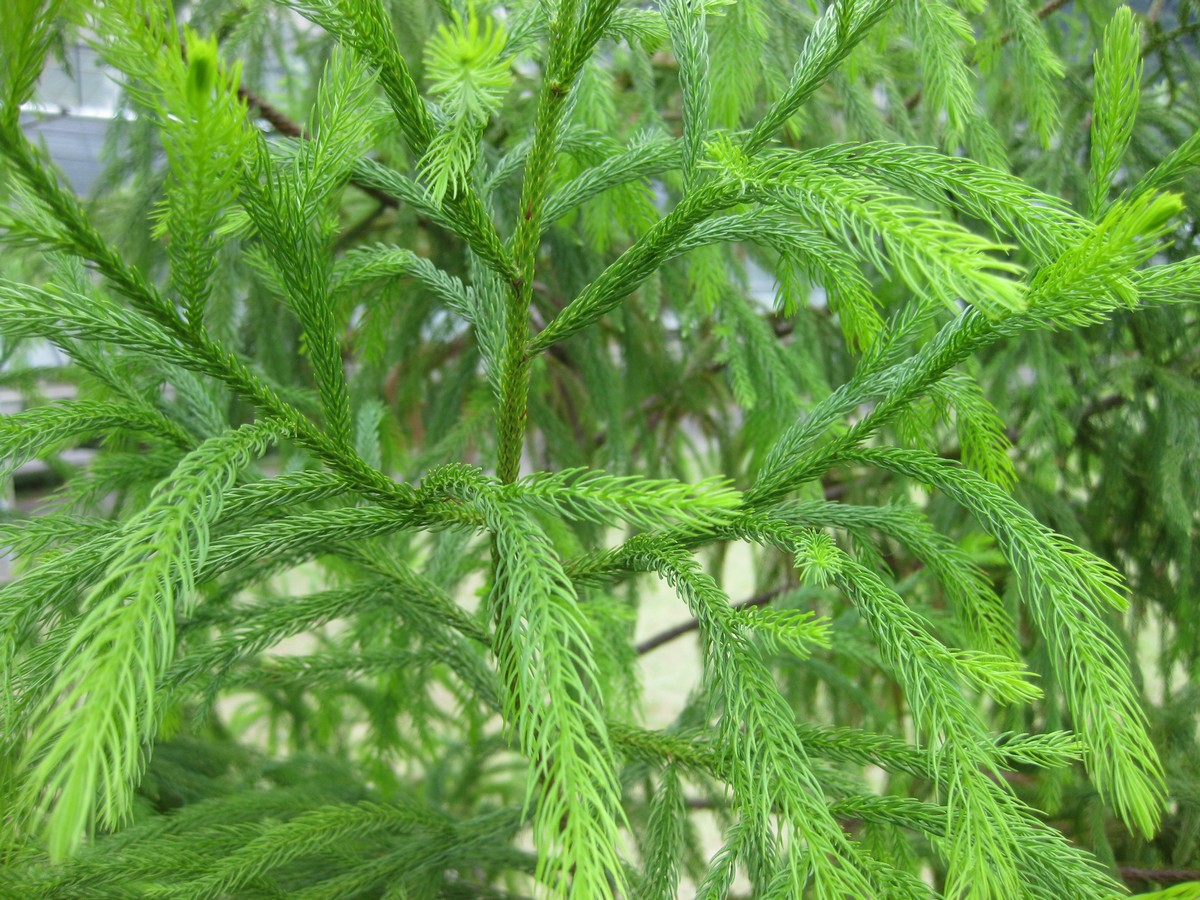

Dacrydium elatum is a species of conifer in the family Podocarpaceae. It is found in Cambodia, Indonesia, Laos, Malaysia, Thailand, and Vietnam.

It is a tree up to 30 metres (98 ft) tall, with a diameter at breast height up to 80 centimetres (31 in).
