= Dacrydium comosum =

Conservation status
- Endangered (IUCN 3.1)

Scientific classification
- Kingdom: Plantae
- Clade: Tracheophytes
- Clade: Gymnospermae
- Division: Pinophyta
- Class: Pinopsida
- Order: Araucariales
- Family: Podocarpaceae
- Genus: Dacrydium
- Species: D. comosum

Binomial name
- Dacrydium comosum Corner

Synonyms
- Corneria comosa (Corner) A.V.Bobrov & Melikyan

Species of conifer

Dacrydium comosum is a species of conifer in the family Podocarpaceae. It is a shrub or small tree endemic to Peninsular Malaysia. It is known from only five mountain locations in Peninsular Malaysia, including the Genting Highlands and Gunung Ulu Kali. It grows in stunted mossy forest on exposed ridges, on rocky acidic and peaty soils, from 1,170 to 1,440 metres elevation. The species may be threatened by fire and tourism.

The species was first described by E. J. H. Corner in 1939.
