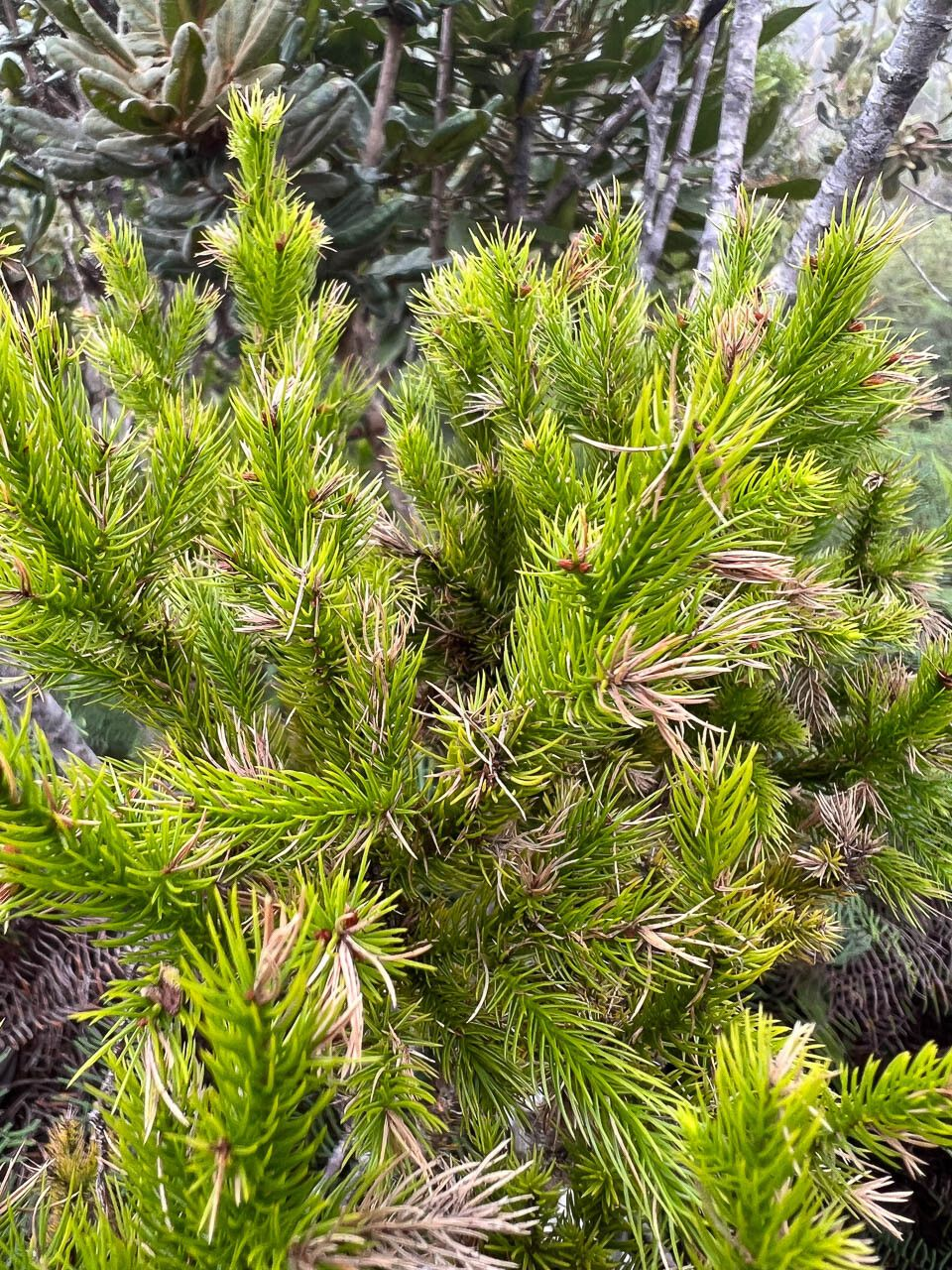

Conservation status
- Near Threatened (IUCN 3.1)

Scientific classification
- Kingdom: Plantae
- Clade: Tracheophytes
- Clade: Gymnosperms
- Division: Pinophyta
- Class: Pinopsida
- Order: Araucariales
- Family: Podocarpaceae
- Genus: Dacrydium
- Species: D. lycopodioides

Binomial name
- Dacrydium lycopodioides Brongn. & Gris

= Dacrydium lycopodioides =

Species of conifer

Dacrydium lycopodioides is a species of conifer in the family Podocarpaceae, endemic to New Caledonia. It has faced significant threats due to habitat loss, primarily from deforestation, mining activities, and land development.
