= Dacrydium nidulum =

Conservation status
- Least Concern (IUCN 3.1)

Scientific classification
- Kingdom: Plantae
- Clade: Tracheophytes
- Clade: Gymnosperms
- Division: Pinophyta
- Class: Pinopsida
- Order: Araucariales
- Family: Podocarpaceae
- Genus: Dacrydium
- Species: D. nidulum

Binomial name
- Dacrydium nidulum de Laub.

Synonyms
- Corneria nidula (de Laub.) A.V.Bobrov & Melikyan; Dacrydium nidulum var. vitiensis Silba

Species of conifer

Dacrydium nidulum is a species of coniferous tree in the family Podocarpaceae. It is native to Fiji, the Lesser Sunda Islands (Sumba), the Maluku Islands, New Guinea, and Sulawesi.

Dacrydium nidulum is a large canopy tree which grows in lowland tropical rain forest, often in swampy areas and along river banks and lake shores. It is mostly found between 600 and 750 metres elevation, and occasionally as low as ten metres elevation.

The species was first described by David John de Laubenfels in 1969.
