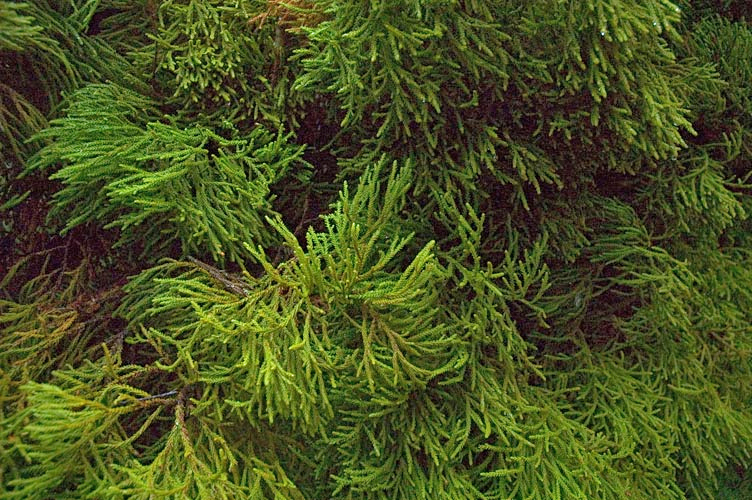

Scientific classification
- Kingdom: Plantae
- Clade: Tracheophytes
- Clade: Gymnosperms
- Division: Pinophyta
- Class: Pinopsida
- Order: Araucariales
- Family: Podocarpaceae
- Genus: Dacrydium; Lamb.

Type species
- Dacrydium cupressinum Solander ex Forster

Species
- See text.

Synonyms
- Corneria Bobrov & Melikian non Furtado; Gaussenia Bobrov & Melikian; Metadacrydium Baum.-Bod. ex Melikian & Bobrov

= Dacrydium =

Dacrydium Temporal range: Cretaceous-Recent (Late Cretaceous-Holocene), 71.3–0 Ma

Genus of conifers

Dacrydium is a genus of conifers in the family Podocarpaceae, containing sixteen species of dioecious trees and shrubs. The genus was first described by Solander in 1786, and formerly included many more species, which were divided into sections A, B, and C by Florin in 1931. The revisions of de Laubenfels and Quinn (see references), reclassified the former section A as the new genus Falcatifolium, divided Section C into new genera Lepidothamnus, Lagarostrobos and Halocarpus, and retained Section B as genus Dacrydium.

== Species ==
As of March 2025, Plants of the World Online accepted twenty one species:

Phylogeny of Dacrydium

- - D. cupressinum Solander ex Forster (rimu, red pine)
  - - - D. balansae Brongniart & Gris
      - - D. nausoriense de Laubenfels
        - - - D. araucarioides Brongniart & Gris
            - D. nidulum de Laubenfels
          - - D. guillauminii Buchholz (Cat-tail Rimu)
            - D. lycopodioides Brongniart & Gris
    - - - - D. elatum (Roxburgh) Wallich ex Hooker
          - D. pectinatum de Laubenfels
        - - D. magnum de Laubenfels
          - D. xanthandrum Pilger
      - - D. gibbsiae Stapf
        - - D. beccarii Parlatore
          - - D. comosum Corner
            - D. gracile de Laubenfels

Image	Scientific name	Distribution
	Dacrydium araucarioides	New Caledonia
	Dacrydium balansae	New Caledonia
	Dacrydium beccarii	Indonesia, Malaysia, Papua New Guinea, Philippines, Solomon Islands
	Dacrydium comosum	Peninsular Malaysia
	Dacrydium cupressinum	New Zealand
	Dacrydium cornwallianum	Indonesia, Papua New Guinea
	Dacrydium elatum	Cambodia, Indonesia, Laos, Malaysia, Thailand, Vietnam
	Dacrydium ericoides	Malaysia
	Dacrydium gibbsiae	Borneo, Mount Kinabalu
	Dacrydium gracile	Malaysia
	Dacrydium guillauminii	New Caledonia
	Dacrydium leptophyllum	Indonesia
	Dacrydium lycopodioides	New Caledonia
	Dacrydium magnum	Indonesia, Papua New Guinea
	Dacrydium medium	Indonesia, Malaysia
	Dacrydium nausoriense	Fiji
	Dacrydium nidulum	Fiji, Indonesia, Papua New Guinea
	Dacrydium novo-guineense	Papua New Guinea
	Dacrydium pectinatum	Borneo, Hainan, Philippines, Sumatra
	Dacrydium spathoides	Indonesia
	Dacrydium xanthandrum	Indonesia, Malaysia, Papua New Guinea, Philippines

== Distribution ==
The natural range of Dacrydium extends from New Zealand, New Caledonia, Fiji and the Solomon Islands through Malesia (New Guinea, Indonesia, Malaysia and the Philippines), to Thailand and southern China.
