= Dacrydium nausoriense =

Conservation status
- Endangered (IUCN 3.1)

Scientific classification
- Kingdom: Plantae
- Clade: Tracheophytes
- Clade: Gymnosperms
- Division: Pinophyta
- Class: Pinopsida
- Order: Araucariales
- Family: Podocarpaceae
- Genus: Dacrydium
- Species: D. nausoriense

Binomial name
- Dacrydium nausoriense de Laub.

Synonyms
- Corneria nausoriensis (de Laub.) A.V.Bobrov & Melikyan

Species of conifer

Dacrydium nausoriense is a species of conifer in the family Podocarpaceae. It is endemic to Fiji, where it is only known from one subpopulation on each of the two main islands, Viti Levu and Vanua Levu. It is a valuable timber tree which has been overharvested. This overexploitation and habitat loss are the main threats to this endangered species.
