= Dacrydium magnum =

Conservation status
- Near Threatened (IUCN 3.1)

Scientific classification
- Kingdom: Plantae
- Clade: Tracheophytes
- Clade: Gymnosperms
- Division: Pinophyta
- Class: Pinopsida
- Order: Araucariales
- Family: Podocarpaceae
- Genus: Dacrydium
- Species: D. magnum

Binomial name
- Dacrydium magnum de Laub.

Synonyms
- Corneria magna (de Laub.) A.V.Bobrov & Melikyan; Dacrydium beccarii var. rudens de Laub.

Species of conifer

Dacrydium magnum is a species of conifer in the family Podocarpaceae. It is a tree native to the Obi Islands in Maluku Province of eastern Indonesia, the Louisiade Archipelago (Tagula Island) and D'Entrecasteaux Islands (Normanby Island) in eastern Papua New Guinea, and the Solomon Islands. It grows in lowland and lower montane tropical rain forest from 60 to 1,200 metres elevation. It can be a dominant tree on forested ridges, and grows as a stunted tree on exposed sites. It is threatened by habitat loss.
