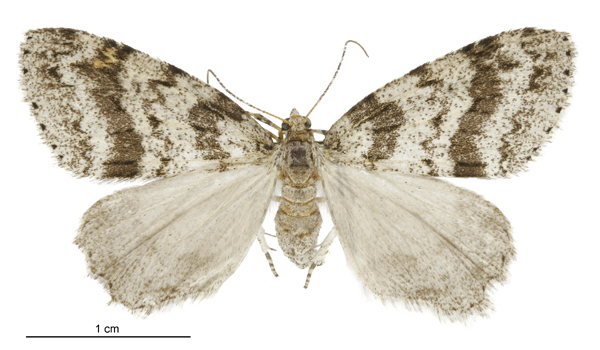
- Female
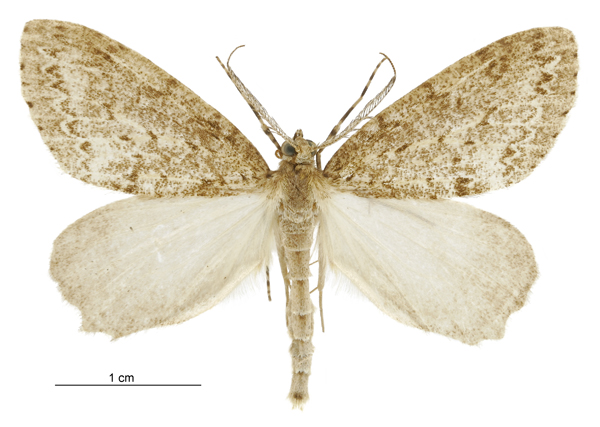
- Male

Scientific classification
- Kingdom: Animalia
- Phylum: Arthropoda
- Clade: Pancrustacea
- Class: Insecta
- Order: Lepidoptera
- Family: Geometridae
- Genus: Pseudocoremia
- Species: P. fenerata

Binomial name
- Pseudocoremia fenerata (C. Felder & Rogenhofer, 1875)

Synonyms
- Rhyparia fenerata Felder & Rogenhofer, 1875; Selidosema fenerata (Felder & Rogenhofer, 1875); Selidosema argentaria Philpott, 1913; Selidosema adusta Philpott, 1930

= Pseudocoremia fenerata =

Species of moth

Pseudocoremia fenerata is a moth of the family Geometridae. It is endemic to New Zealand. It was first described by C. Felder & Rogenhofer in 1875 and originally named Rhyparia fenerata.

The wingspan is 27–34 mm.

Recorded food plants of the larvae include Agathis australis, Dacrydium bidwillii, Dacrydium biforme, Dacrydium cupressinum, Phyllocladus alpinus, Phyllocladus trichomanoides, Podocarpus ferrugineus and Podocarpus totara. Exotic hosts are Chamaecyparis lawsoniana, Cryptomeria japonica, Larix decidua, Larix kempferi and Pinus species.
