= Dacrydium pectinatum =

Conservation status
- Endangered (IUCN 3.1)

Scientific classification
- Kingdom: Plantae
- Clade: Tracheophytes
- Clade: Gymnosperms
- Division: Pinophyta
- Class: Pinopsida
- Order: Araucariales
- Family: Podocarpaceae
- Genus: Dacrydium
- Species: D. pectinatum

Binomial name
- Dacrydium pectinatum de Laub.

Synonyms
- Corneria pectinata (de Laub.) A.V.Bobrov & Melikyan

Species of conifer

Dacrydium pectinatum is a species of conifer in the family Podocarpaceae. It grows naturally in Hainan, Borneo, the Philippines and Sumatra. The species is found in peat swamps and other wetland envoirments. On average it grows 3 to 40 m (10 to 130 ft) tall.
