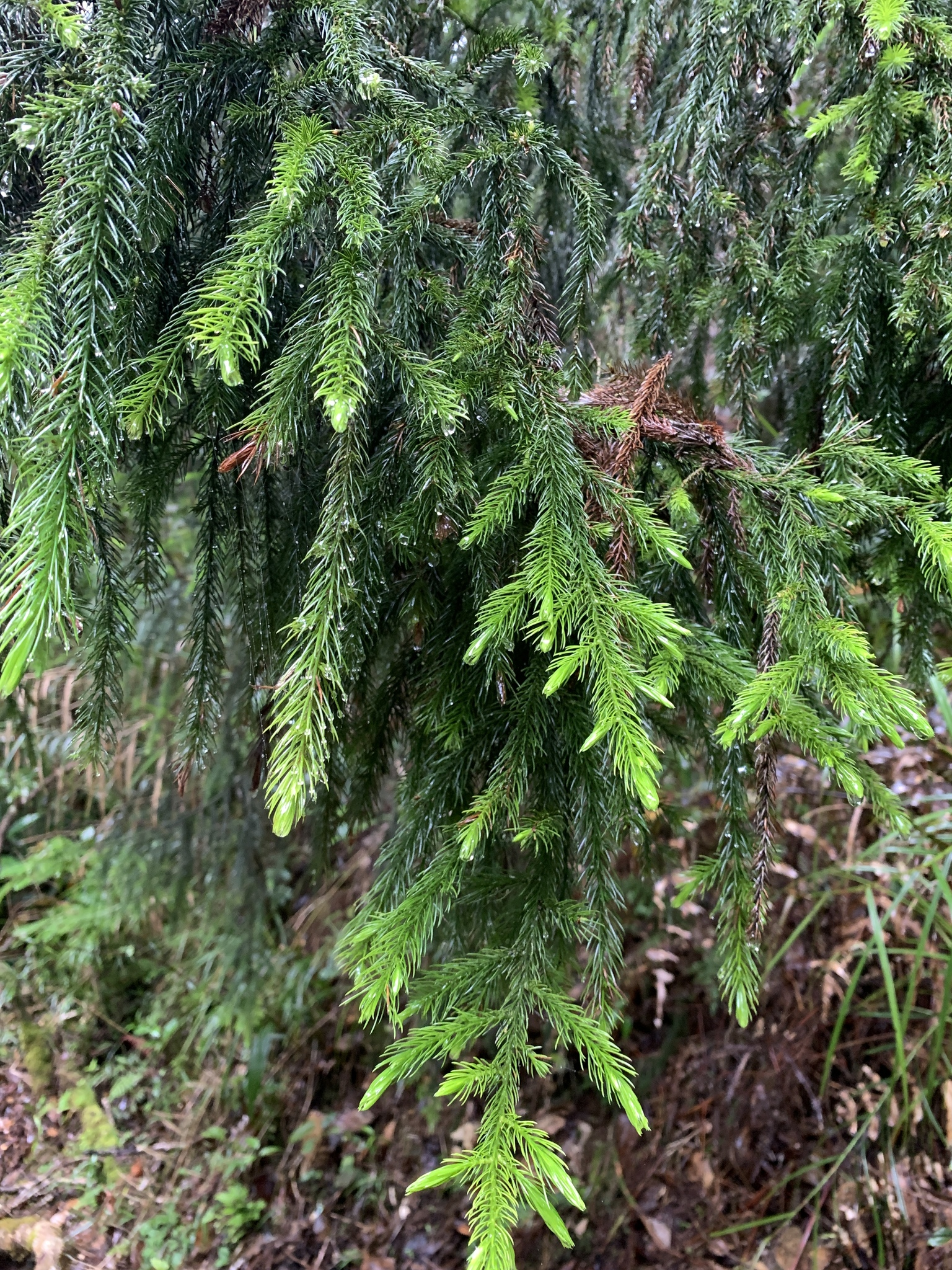

Conservation status
- Near Threatened (IUCN 3.1)

Scientific classification
- Kingdom: Plantae
- Clade: Tracheophytes
- Clade: Gymnosperms
- Division: Pinophyta
- Class: Pinopsida
- Order: Araucariales
- Family: Podocarpaceae
- Genus: Dacrydium
- Species: D. gracile

Binomial name
- Dacrydium gracile de Laub.

Synonyms
- Dacrydium gracilis de Laub.; Corneria gracilis (de Laub.) A.V.Bobrov & Melikyan

= Dacrydium gracile =

Species of conifer

Dacrydium gracile is a species of conifer in the family Podocarpaceae. It is endemic to Malaysian Borneo.

== Range and habitat ==
Dacrydium gracile is endemic to Malaysian Borneo. It is found principally in the vicinity of Mount Kinabalu in Sabah, and is also known from one location in Sarawak.

It is native to lower montane rain forest, between 950 and 1,800 metres elevation. It is generally found in nutrient-poor soils, associated with the conifers Agathis borneensis, Podocarpus laubenfelsii, Sundacarpus amarus, Falcatifolium falciforme, Nageia wallichiana, and Dacrycarpus imbricatus. In Sarawak it occurs in low-canopy heath forest on infertile sandstone.
