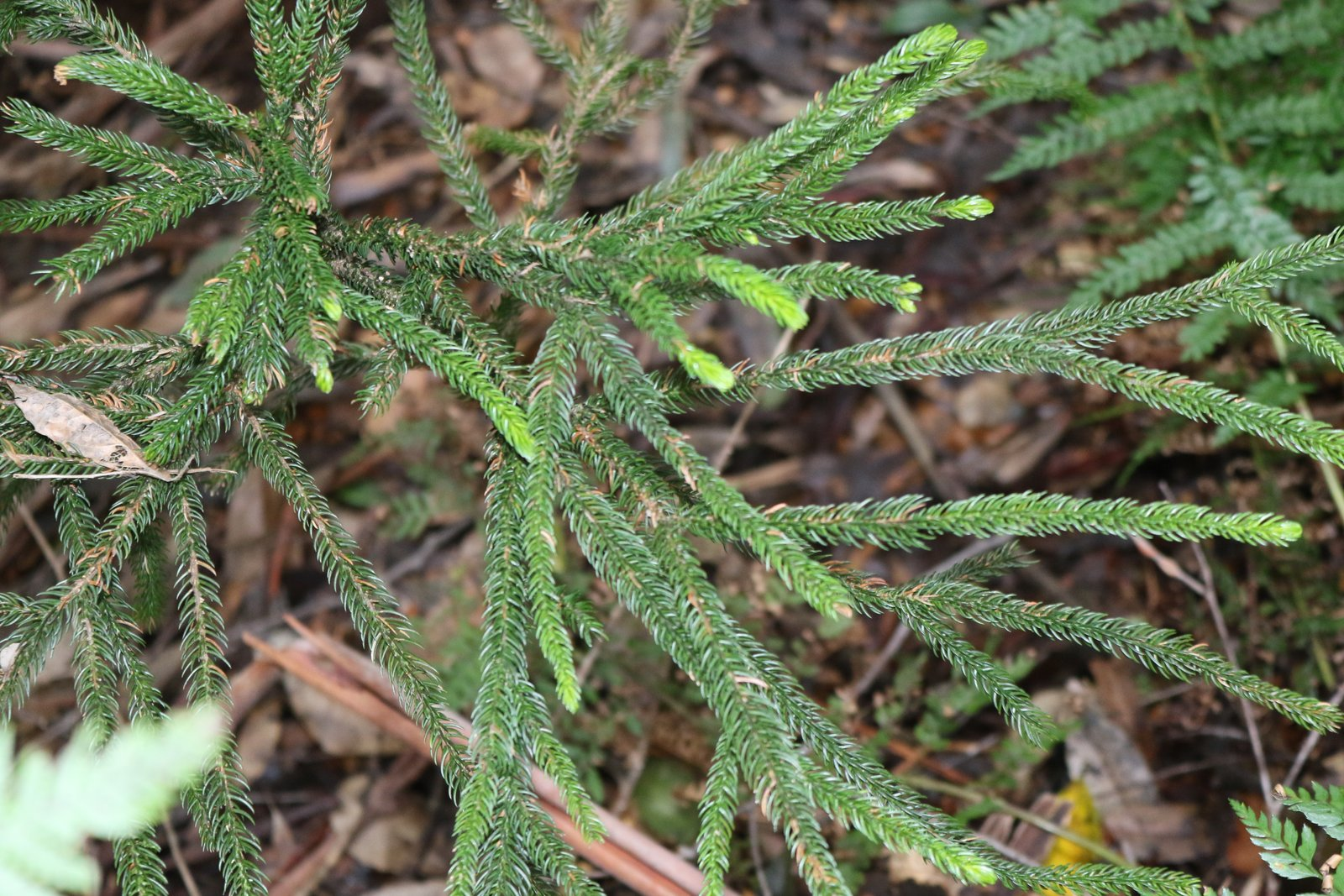

Conservation status
- Least Concern (IUCN 3.1)

Scientific classification
- Kingdom: Plantae
- Clade: Tracheophytes
- Clade: Gymnosperms
- Division: Pinophyta
- Class: Pinopsida
- Order: Araucariales
- Family: Podocarpaceae
- Genus: Dacrydium
- Species: D. araucarioides

Binomial name
- Dacrydium araucarioides Brongn. & Gris

= Dacrydium araucarioides =

Species of conifer

Dacrydium araucarioides is a species of conifer in the family Podocarpaceae, endemic to New Caledonia. It is a small tree that reaches a height between 3 and 6 metres (9.8 and 19.7 ft).

The species is common and widespread, particularly in the south of the main island of Grande Terre and along the east coast northwards to Houailou.
