= Seed trap =

Device used to capture seeds from plants

Seed traps are used in ecology and forestry to capture seeds falling from plants, allowing seed production and dispersal to be quantified. They come in several forms, including funnel traps, sticky traps (using materials such as fly paper), nets and pots exposed in the field.

== Types of trap ==
There are many options when using seed traps based on the specific need for the project. Seed traps can be made in different sizes, shapes, and of different material. Traditionally, seed traps are wooden frames with a screened bottom. Traps with metal frames have also been used. Additionally, funnel-shaped traps that are set above the soil or leveled at the ground, traps with screen or cloth bags, traps with water or soil to germinate them, plastic buckets, or traps with sticky surfaces have been used.

=== Sticky traps ===
The substance on sticky traps must be nontoxic to the seeds and non-drying. Many sticky traps are petroleum-based. They are also cheaper (approximately $1.20–1.30 per use), lighter and less bulky than other traps. However, rain or dew may affect the adhesive. Heat and light intensities can also cause sticky traps to lose their adhesiveness.

=== Pollen traps ===
Pollen traps are used to measure production and dispersal of pollen in plants. These traps are commonly made of glass slides with silicone oils or sticky tapes. They can be set up horizontally or as cylinder containers.

=== Fruit traps ===
These traps can collect fruit production from various plants. These are also constructed on the ground, hanging or as basins or funnels.

== Choosing a trap ==
When choosing a trap, certain factors must be considered. The seed dispersal unit (where the seeds will fall), timing of dispersal, and density of seed fall (how much will be produced). Smaller traps may be appropriate for trees that produce more seeds, and larger traps may be appropriate for trees that produce less seeds to guarantee collection. It is difficult to compare different traps.

There are also some drawbacks to consider when choosing a trap. Wood traps may easily deteriorate if not constructed properly. Traps may also be hard to store or set up depending on size. Cloth and screens are easily torn in bad weather conditions and are also targets for animals. Screens may also harm many insects. Traps with water or soil must be maintained consistently. Extra seeds may clog the traps or seeds may be blown or washed out causing an over or underestimate of seed dispersal. Sticky traps are also clogged by other debris.

== Maintenance ==
Traps must be checked weekly depending on the rate of seed dispersal. Seed identification must be accurate. This can be challenging because there is no comprehensive identification key, so focusing on only a few species at a time is important. You can also attempt to germinate the seeds. Screens may help prevent predation by animals and insects.
