= Dacrydium xanthandrum =

Conservation status
- Least Concern (IUCN 3.1)

Scientific classification
- Kingdom: Plantae
- Clade: Tracheophytes
- Clade: Gymnosperms
- Division: Pinophyta
- Class: Pinopsida
- Order: Araucariales
- Family: Podocarpaceae
- Genus: Dacrydium
- Species: D. xanthandrum

Binomial name
- Dacrydium xanthandrum Pilg.

Synonyms
- Corneria xanthandra (Pilg.) A.V.Bobrov & Melikyan

Species of conifer

Dacrydium xanthandrum is a species of coniferous tree in the family Podocarpaceae. It is native to an area ranging from Peninsular Malaysia to Sumatra, Borneo, the Philippines, Sulawesi, the Maluku Islands, New Guinea and the Bismarck Archipelago to the Solomon Islands.

It is a widespread tree which can be locally common or dominant. It is often dominant in low mossy montane rain forest on mountain ridges up to 2,700 metres elevation, where it grows on exposed rocky outcrops, on peaty soils over acidic rocks (dacite, granite, or sandstone), or on nutrient-poor sand, typically among broadleaf shrubs and small trees of family Myrtaceae. It is less common as in lowland rain forest, where it grows as individual tall trees.
