= The Journal of Steroid Biochemistry and Molecular Biology =

- Discipline: Biochemistry, molecular biology
- Language: English
- Edited by: Jerzy Adamski

Publication details
- Former name(s): Journal of Steroid Biochemistry
- History: 1969-present
- Publisher: Elsevier
- Impact factor: 5.011 (2021)

Standard abbreviations
- ISO 4: J. Steroid Biochem. Mol. Biol.

Indexing
- CODEN: JSBBEZ
- ISSN: 0960-0760
- OCLC no.: 663657253

Links
- Journal homepage; Online archive

The Journal of Steroid Biochemistry and Molecular Biology is a peer-reviewed scientific journal, covering all aspects of steroid metabolism. It was established in the 1969 as Journal of Steroid Biochemistry and obtained its current name in 1990. The editor-in-chief is Jerzy Adamski (Helmholtz Zentrum München). According to the Journal Citation Reports, the journal has a 2021 impact factor of 5.011.

== Abstracting and indexing ==
The journal is abstracted and indexed in:

- BIOSIS Previews
- Cambridge Scientific Abstracts
- Chemical Abstracts
- Current Contents/Life Sciences
- EMBASE
- EMBiology
- Elsevier BIOBASE
- MEDLINE/PubMed
- PASCAL
- Science Citation Index
- Scopus
