= Normanby Island =

Normanby Island may refer to:

- Normanby Island (Queensland), in Australia
- Normanby Island (Papua New Guinea)
