= Plants (journal) =

- Discipline: Biology
- Language: English
- Edited by: Dilantha Fernando

Publication details
- History: 2011–present
- Publisher: MDPI
- Frequency: Continuous
- Open access: Yes
- License: Creative Commons Attribution License
- Impact factor: 4.658 (2021)

Standard abbreviations
- ISO 4: Plants

Indexing
- ISSN: 2223-7747
- LCCN: 2014234527
- OCLC no.: 858888029

Links
- Journal homepage

Plants is a peer-reviewed open-access scientific journal that covers various areas of plant biology, including cellular biology, molecular biology, genetics, and ecology. It is published by MDPI and was established in 2011. The editor-in-chief is Clive Dilantha Fernando (University of Manitoba).

The journal publishes original research articles, review articles, and short communications.

== Abstracting and indexing ==
The journal is abstracted and indexed in:

- CAB Abstracts
- Current Contents/Agriculture, Biology & Environmental Sciences
- EBSCO databases
- ProQuest databases
- Science Citation Index Expanded
- Scopus

According to the Journal Citation Reports, the journal has a 2021 impact factor of 4.658.
