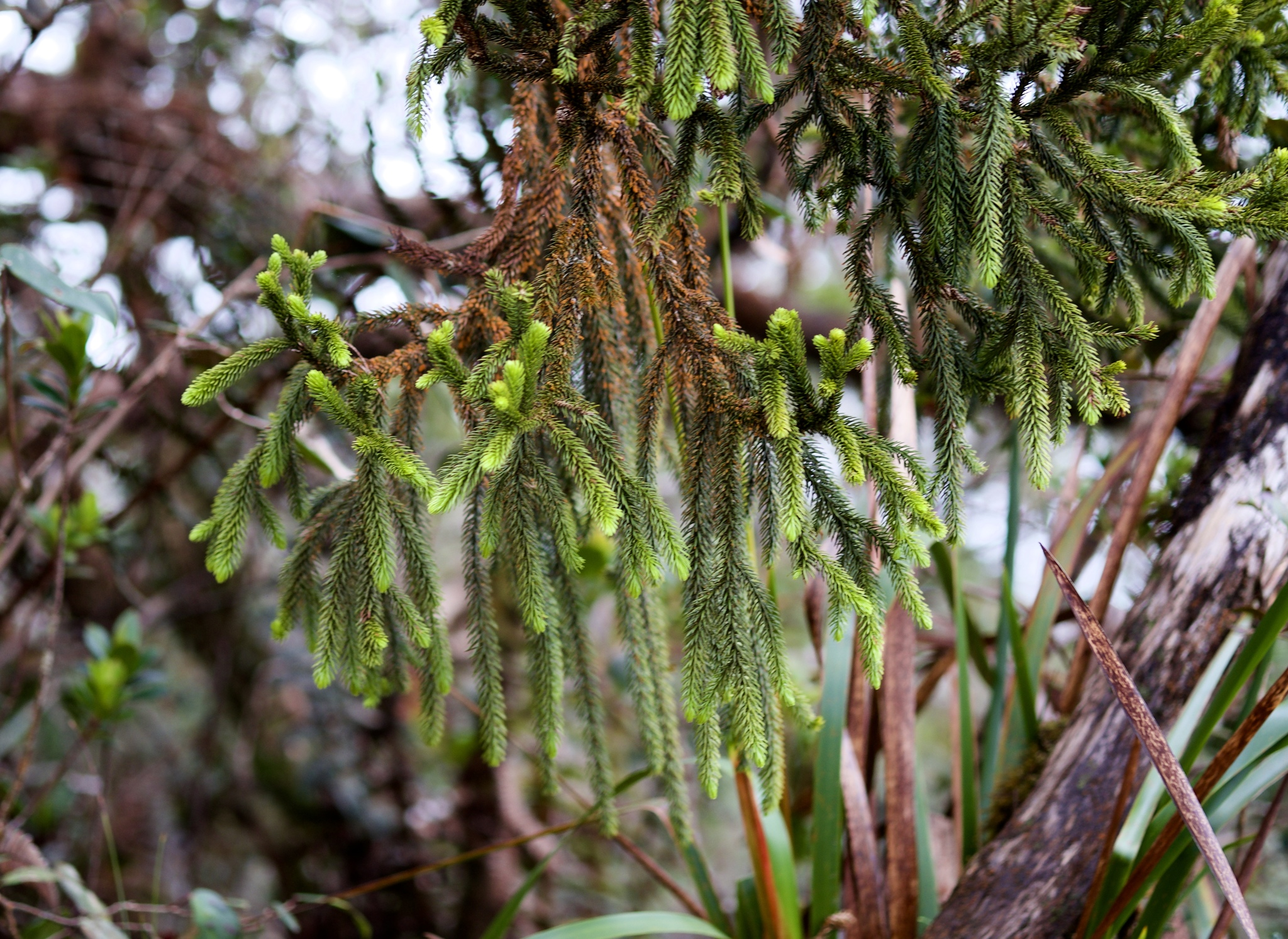

Conservation status
- Least Concern (IUCN 3.1)

Scientific classification
- Kingdom: Plantae
- Clade: Embryophytes
- Clade: Tracheophytes
- Clade: Gymnosperms
- Division: Pinophyta
- Class: Pinopsida
- Order: Araucariales
- Family: Podocarpaceae
- Genus: Dacrydium
- Species: D. gibbsiae

Binomial name
- Dacrydium gibbsiae Stapf

Synonyms
- Corneria gibbsiae (Stapf) A.V.Bobrov & Melikyan

= Dacrydium gibbsiae =

Species of conifer

Dacrydium gibbsiae is a species of conifer in the family Podocarpaceae, endemic to Borneo. It grows on Mount Kinabalu on ultramafic soil, and is notable for being able to tolerate the high levels of toxic metal compounds present in these soils.
