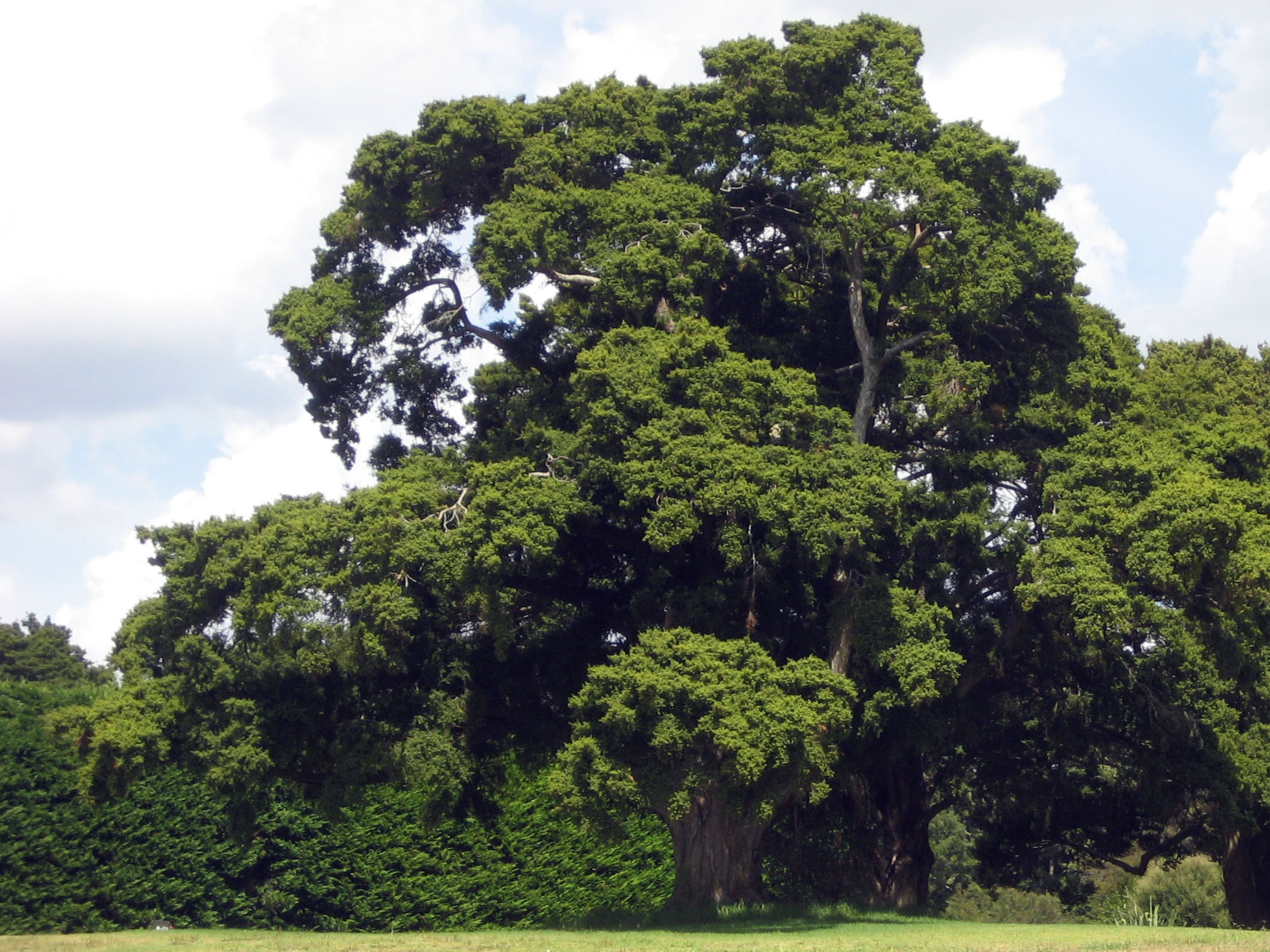
- Podocarpus totara, a member of Podocarpaceae
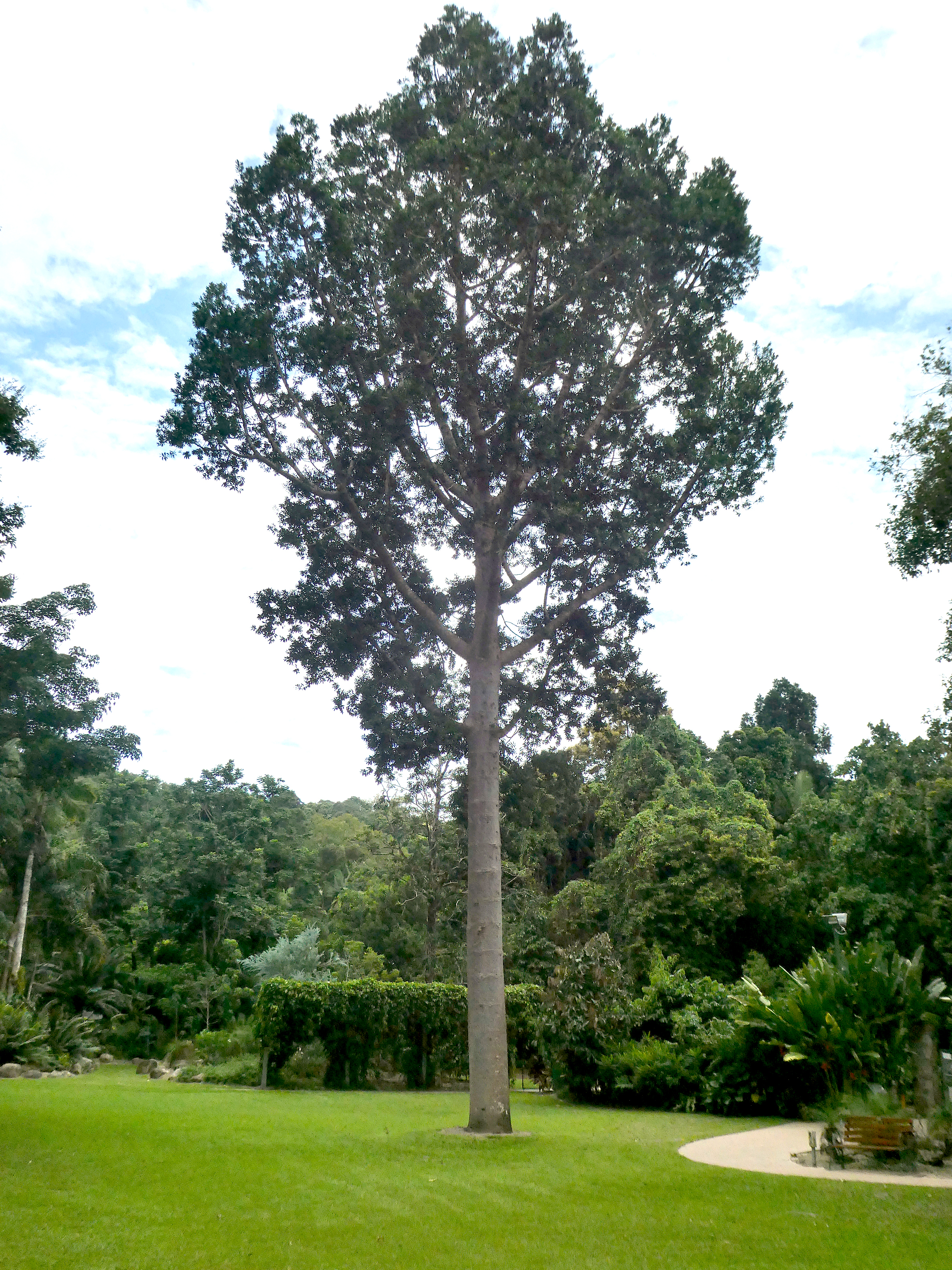
- Agathis robusta, a member of Araucariaceae

Scientific classification
- Kingdom: Plantae
- Clade: Embryophytes
- Clade: Tracheophytes
- Clade: Gymnosperms
- Division: Pinophyta
- Class: Pinopsida
- Subclass: Cupressidae
- Order: Araucariales; Seward, Ford

Families
- Podocarpaceae; Araucariaceae

= Araucariales =

Araucariales Temporal range: Permian–Present

Order of plants

Araucariales is one of two orders of conifers within the subclass Cupressidae. It comprises the families Podocarpaceae and Araucariaceae, both of whose surviving members are mainly southern hemisphere conifers.
