= Podocarpus insularis =

Conservation status
- Least Concern (IUCN 3.1)

Scientific classification
- Kingdom: Plantae
- Clade: Tracheophytes
- Clade: Gymnosperms
- Division: Pinophyta
- Class: Pinopsida
- Order: Araucariales
- Family: Podocarpaceae
- Genus: Podocarpus
- Species: P. insularis

Binomial name
- Podocarpus insularis de Laub.

Species of conifer

Podocarpus insularis is a species of conifer in the family Podocarpaceae. It is a tree native to New Britain, the D'Entrecasteaux Islands, Louisiade Archipelago, and Woodlark Island in Papua New Guinea as well as the Solomon Islands and possibly Vanuatu. It grows in submontane to montane rain forest up to 1,500 metres elevation, growing as a tall tree in high-canopied forests and as a low stunted tree on exposed ridges. It typically grows among broadleaved (Angiosperm) trees, such as with Nothofagus on New Britain. On ridges it is associated with the podocarps P. neriifolius and P. glaucus. It grows with species of Casuarina on ultramafic soils.

The species was described by David John de Laubenfels in 1985.
