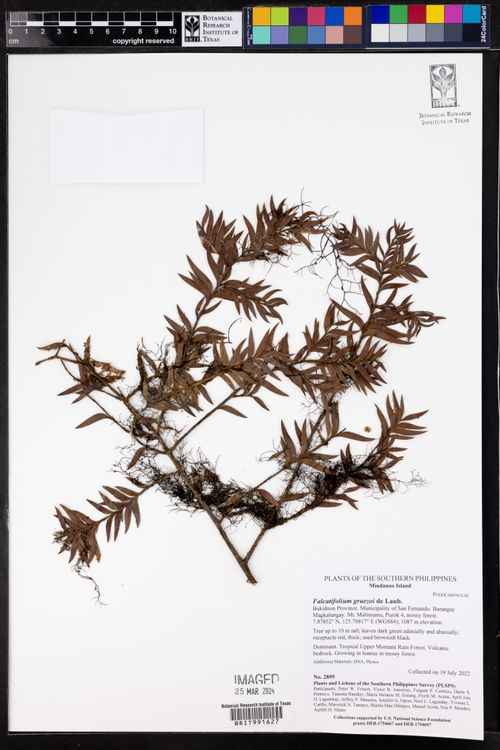

Conservation status
- Near Threatened (IUCN 3.1)

Scientific classification
- Kingdom: Plantae
- Clade: Tracheophytes
- Clade: Gymnosperms
- Division: Pinophyta
- Class: Pinopsida
- Order: Araucariales
- Family: Podocarpaceae
- Genus: Falcatifolium
- Species: F. gruezoi

Binomial name
- Falcatifolium gruezoi de Laub.

= Falcatifolium gruezoi =

Species of conifer

Falcatifolium gruezoi is a species of conifer in the family Podocarpaceae, native to the Philippines, Obi in the Maluku Islands, and Sulawesi. It is native to montane rain forests, generally on exposed ridges and forest margins, from 1,200 to 1,800 metres elevation. It is often associated with the conifers Agathis borneensis, Nageia wallichiana, and Sundacarpus amarus. It is threatened with habitat loss from deforestation, particularly in the Philippines. The IUCN Red List assesses the species as Near Threatened.
