= Podocarpus idenburgensis =

Scientific classification
- Kingdom: Plantae
- Clade: Tracheophytes
- Clade: Gymnospermae
- Division: Pinophyta
- Class: Pinopsida
- Order: Araucariales
- Family: Podocarpaceae
- Genus: Podocarpus
- Species: P. idenburgensis

Binomial name
- Podocarpus idenburgensis N.E.Gray (1958)

Species of conifer

Podocarpus idenburgensis is a species of conifer in the family Podocarpaceae. It is a tree native to Papuasia (New Guinea, the Bismarck Archipelago, and the Solomon Islands) and Fiji.

It is a large tree, growing up to 40 meters in the forest canopy. It grows in mountain rainforests from low elevations to 1,650 meters, most commonly at middle elevations.

It belongs to the P. neriifolius group, and specimens were previously identified as P. neriifolius. De Laubenfels identified the eastern populations from New Guinea to Fiji as P. idenburgensis, distinguished by narrow, acute leaves, with P. neriifolius ranging from the Philippines and Sulawesi westwards to mainland southeast Asia as far as Nepal.
