= Retrophyllum filicifolium =

Conservation status
- Least Concern (IUCN 3.1)

Scientific classification
- Kingdom: Plantae
- Clade: Tracheophytes
- Clade: Gymnosperms
- Division: Pinophyta
- Class: Pinopsida
- Order: Araucariales
- Family: Podocarpaceae
- Genus: Retrophyllum
- Species: R. filicifolium

Binomial name
- Retrophyllum filicifolium (N.E.Gray) R.R.Mill

Synonyms
- Podocarpus filicifolius N.E.Gray

Species of conifer

Retrophyllum filicifolium is a species of conifer in the family Podocarpaceae. It is a tree native to New Guinea, the Bismarck Archipelago, and the Maluku Islands. It grows in primary montane rain forest and submontane ridge forest, mostly between 900 and 1,500 metres and occasionally as low as 300 metres or up to 1,800 metres elevation. It is associated with trees of genera Dacrycarpus, Agathis, Podocarpus, Serianthes, Syzygium, and Gymnostoma, and emergent palms including Gulubia sp.

The species was first described as Podocarpus filicifolius by Netta Elizabeth Gray in 1962. In 2016 Robert R. Mill placed the species in genus Retrophyllum as R. filicifolium.
