= Acmopyle sahniana =

Conservation status
- Critically Endangered (IUCN 3.1)

Scientific classification
- Kingdom: Plantae
- Clade: Embryophytes
- Clade: Tracheophytes
- Clade: Gymnosperms
- Division: Pinophyta
- Class: Pinopsida
- Order: Araucariales
- Family: Podocarpaceae
- Genus: Acmopyle
- Species: A. sahniana

Binomial name
- Acmopyle sahniana J.Buchholz & N.E.Gray

Species of conifer

Acmopyle sahniana is a species of conifer in the family Podocarpaceae, endemic to Fiji. It is threatened by habitat loss.
