= Falcatifolium papuanum =

Conservation status
- Least Concern (IUCN 3.1)

Scientific classification
- Kingdom: Plantae
- Clade: Tracheophytes
- Clade: Gymnosperms
- Division: Pinophyta
- Class: Pinopsida
- Order: Araucariales
- Family: Podocarpaceae
- Genus: Falcatifolium
- Species: F. papuanum

Binomial name
- Falcatifolium papuanum de Laub.

Synonyms
- Dacrydium papuanum (de Laub.) Whitmore

Species of conifer

Falcatifolium papuanum is a species of conifer in the family Podocarpaceae. It is a tree endemic to New Guinea.
