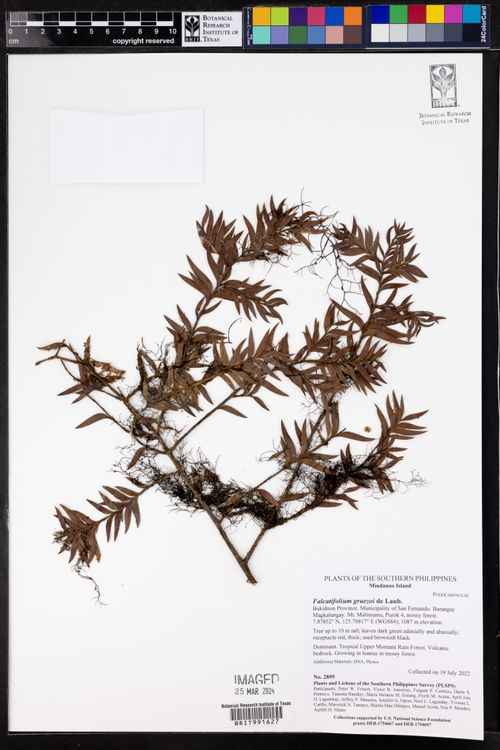
- Falcatifolium gruezoi

Scientific classification
- Kingdom: Plantae
- Clade: Tracheophytes
- Clade: Gymnosperms
- Division: Pinophyta
- Class: Pinopsida
- Order: Araucariales
- Family: Podocarpaceae
- Genus: Falcatifolium de Laub.

Type species
- Falcatifolium falciforme (Parl.) de Laub.

Species
- F. angustum de Laub.; F. falciforme (Parl.) de Laub.; F. gruezoi de Laub.; F. papuanum de Laub.; F. sleumeri de Laub. & Silba; F. taxoides (Brongn. & Gris) de Laub.

= Falcatifolium =

Genus of conifers

Falcatifolium is a genus of conifers of the family Podocarpaceae. The genus includes six species of dioecious shrubs and large trees of up to 36 metres (118 ft). The genus was first described by de Laubenfels in 1969, and is composed of species formerly classified in the genus Dacrydium.

The Facatifolium genus ranges from New Caledonia to the Malay Peninsula, including New Guinea, the Indonesian islands of Sulawesi, Sumatra, Borneo, and the Obi and Riau Islands, and the Philippine island of Mindoro.

Falcatifolium taxoides from New Caledonia is the exclusive host of the Parasitaxus usta, the only known parasitic gymnosperm.

== Phylogeny ==
Phylogeny of Falcatifolium

- - F. papuanum de Laubenfels
  - - F. falciforme (Parlatore) de Laubenfels
    - F. taxoides (Brongniart & Gris) de Laubenfels
