= Falcatifolium falciforme =

Conservation status
- Near Threatened (IUCN 3.1)

Scientific classification
- Kingdom: Plantae
- Clade: Tracheophytes
- Clade: Gymnosperms
- Division: Pinophyta
- Class: Pinopsida
- Order: Araucariales
- Family: Podocarpaceae
- Genus: Falcatifolium
- Species: F. falciforme

Binomial name
- Falcatifolium falciforme (Parl.) de Laub.

Synonyms
- Dacrydium falciforme (Parl.) Pilg.; Falcatifolium falciforme var. kinabaluensis Silba; Falcatifolium falciforme var. usan-apuensis de Laub. & Silba; Falcatifolium usan-apuensis (de Laub. & Silba) de Laub. & Silba; Nageia falciformis (Parl.) Kuntze; Podocarpus falciformis Parl.

Species of conifer

Falcatifolium falciforme is a species of conifer in the family Podocarpaceae. It is a tree native to Brunei, Indonesia, and Malaysia, on the Malay Peninsula, Borneo, and Sumatra.

== Habitat and ecology ==
Falcatifolium falciforme is most commonly found on mountain ridges where forest is more sparse. This tree can grow in areas of leached podzolic sands or can grow near larger conifer trees in more fertile soils.
