= Metapodocarpoxylon =

Metapodocarpoxylon Temporal range: Jurassic–Cretaceous

Scientific classification
- Kingdom: Plantae
- Clade: Tracheophytes
- Clade: Gymnosperms
- Division: Pinophyta
- Class: Pinopsida
- Order: Araucariales
- Family: Podocarpaceae
- Genus: †Metapodocarpoxylon; Dupéron-Laudoueneix & Pons, 1985

Extinct genus of conifer

Metapodocarpoxylon is an extinct genus of conifer from the Mesozoic era, suggested to be related with the family Podocarpaceae. The ecological closest living equivalent is the genus Dacrydium, yet this fossil wood probably represented a more basal taxon, maybe akin to Saxegothaea. Alternatively it can represent convergently evolved Palissyales or Voltziales. Multiple species of this genus are known from units that represented vast alluvial plains that were prevalent across regions such as Mali, Morocco, Tunisia, Libya, Lebanon, Cameroon and Egypt, as well in South America (Colombia), with a possible record on Italy, asocciated usually with the genus Agathoxylon, likely building large scale evergreen tropophilous forests. Some species were previously referred to the genus Protophyllocladoxylon. Recent data has revelated the 1st specimens of the genus from the Laurasia region (Huoshaoshan Formation at Qinghai) and the oldest, of Early Jurassic age, suggesting the genus appeared first in the northern hemisphere and then moved to the south. It was after then mostly associated with the Equatorial Mesozoic regions.

== Species ==
- M. libanoticum type Dupéron-Laudoueneix et Pons, 1985 (Edwards,1929, as Mesembrioxylon libanoticum) Lower Cretaceous, Lebanon, Morocco, Tunisia, China
- M. brasiliense Conceição et al., 2025 Jurassic-Cretaceous boundary, Brazil
- M. chudeaui Batton, 1965 Lower Cretaceous, Niger
- M. curitiense Pons, 1978 Lower Cretaceous, Colombia
- M. diphtericum Batton and Boureau, 1965 Lower Cretaceous, Cameroon
- M. leuchsii Kräusel, 1939 Lower Cretaceous, Egypt
- M. madamaense Boureau, 1948 Lower Cretaceous, Algeria, Tunisia
- M. maurianum Gazeau, 1969 Lower-Middle Jurassic, Morocco
- M. rosablancaense Pons, 1971 Lower Cretaceous, Colombia
- M. subdiphtericum Dupéron-Laudoueneix, 1976 Lower Cretaceous, Cameroon, Italy?
- There are also possible occurrences of the genus from Jurassic deposits of Colombia, Morocco and Tunisia, what would indicate that this endemic vegetation persisted in North Gondwana for a long time.
