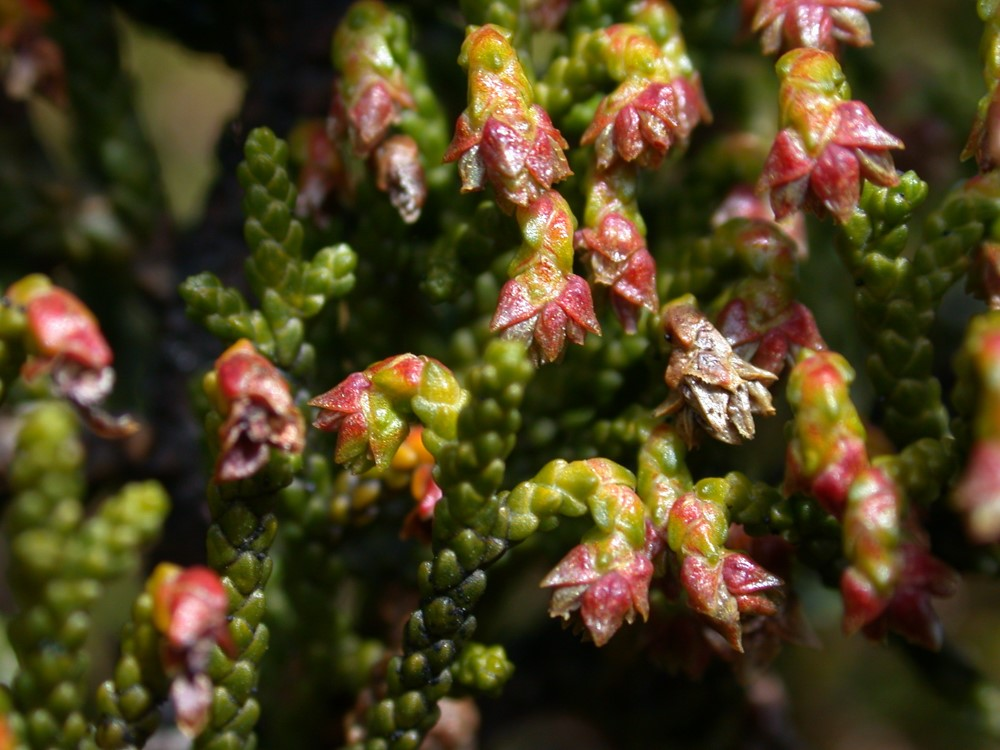
- Pherosphaera hookeriana

Scientific classification
- Kingdom: Plantae
- Clade: Tracheophytes
- Clade: Gymnosperms
- Division: Pinophyta
- Class: Pinopsida
- Order: Araucariales
- Family: Podocarpaceae
- Genus: Pherosphaera
- Species: P. hookeriana

Binomial name
- Pherosphaera hookeriana W.Archer bis

Synonyms
- Dacrydium hookerianum (W.Archer bis) Eichler; Microstrobos niphophilus J.Garden & L.A.S.Johnson; Pherosphaera niphophila (J.Garden & L.A.S.Johnson) Florin

= Pherosphaera hookeriana =

Species of conifer

Pherosphaera hookeriana, the Mount Mawson pine, is a shrubby conifer in the family Podocarpaceae, endemic to Tasmania, at elevations above 600 meters. There are roughly 30 known sites, with population numbers in the tens of thousands. The species occurs in a range of habitats typically in areas near water bodies, mostly on dolerite derived soils. The species is highly fire sensitive and an increase in fire events associated with climate change may lead to local extinction and fragmentation of habitat.

== Description ==
Pherosphaera hookeriana is a densely-branched erect shrub or small tree growing to heights of 5 meters, branches are often small and rigid with leaves arranged spirally and fully appressed to the stem. Individual leaves can measure up to 1.5 mm long, and 1 mm wide, leaves are thick, blunt and concave with a rounded keel. Male flowers form in compressed, terminal globular cones, ranging from 1–5 mm in diameter, with 8 to 15 fertile scales, each scale has two pollen sacs on the abaxial surface. Female flowers occur in cones on short branches that usually droop (hence the old common name). The flowers are globular, 2–4 mm long and have 3-8 fertile scales, with a single ovule on the upper surface of each. When the seed is ripe it has a hard, glossy brown coat and is approximately 1 mm in diameter (Curtis & Morris 1975, Hill 1998).

== Identification and ecology ==
Pherosphaera hookeriana is a dwarf conifer that has been recorded to grow up to 5 meters, but in exposed and harsh environments it may only attain a height of 0.5 meters (Minchin 1983). The foliage of Pherosphaera hookeriana is well adapted to the high elevations it occupies, with small imbricate scale leaves, the stomata are restricted to the adaxial surface and protected by a marginal leaf frill (Hill and Brodribb 1999). The species is generally dioecious, with the reproductive organs occurring on specialised leaves arranged in cone like structures. Pollen is wind dispersed and seed ripening occurs by late April (Wood & Rudman 2015). It is unclear if the plant produces seed annually or produces mass seed every few years (mast seeding). Germination appears to happen only rarely and is restricted to moist, shady areas. The seed is noted as having a dormant period, which could potentially result in a soil-stored seed bank with germination being staggered over several years. It is unknown how long the seed is viable in the soil for, but preliminary studies show that the seed requires warm stratification and then cold stratification to elicit germination; so the earliest it can take place is in the second spring/summer following dispersal (Wood & Rudman 2015). The seedlings superficially resemble small lycopods, with narrow spreading leaves. The seeds drop within a few meters of the parent plant. It has been suggested that dispersal over long distances via water is possible for plants occurring near lakes and rivers. Pherosphaera hookeriana may form extensive clonal colonies via vegetative growth (Fitzgerald 2011). Like most endemic alpine conifers to Tasmania, the growth rate of Pherosphaera hookeriana is extremely slow. Plants that have a stem diameter of 3–6 cm having an estimated age of 250–300 years on Mawson Plateau in Mt Field National Park (Minchin 1983) with the actual maximum ages likely exceeding 500 years. The time frame for plants to reach reproductive maturity is unknown, though there were observations of fruiting plants on the Tarn Shelf in Mt Field National Park in 2016 in areas that suffered fire damage in 1966. Pherosphaera hookeriana is one of only two species in the genus, and is one of the five taxa in the family Podocarpaceae with four being endemic to Tasmania (de Salas & Baker 2016). This species can be confused with the more widespread and often co-occurring Tasmanian endemic shrubby conifer, Diselma archeri.

== Distribution and habitat ==
Pherosphaera hookeriana is endemic to Tasmania's west, southwest and central plateau. The current distribution of the species is most likely to be a reflection of post-glacial expansion from refugia and subsequent fire events (Kirkpatrick & Dickinson 1984). Pherosphaera hookeriana grows from 600 to 1300 meters elevation in a wide range of habitats from alpine to Sphagnum bogs, the common element through the environments the species inhabits is the high soil moisture content and annual rainfall. Confirmed records indicate that the species ranges from the Walls of Jerusalem National Park in the north to Mt La Perouse in Southwest National Park (Tasmanian threatened species guide 2016) – about 12 kilometers from Tasmania's south coast. Most populations of the species occurs on soils derived from Jurassic dolerite, with an exception being a stand in Artichoke Valley near Frenchmans Cap, which grows on sedimentary deposits.

== Population ==
Mount Field National Park has long been recognized as the stronghold for the species with areas of coniferous heath being dominated or co-dominated by the species. There are approximately 30 known stands with an estimated population of 20,000 individuals. There is a high likelihood that stands of the species undiscovered, particularly in the Walls of Jerusalem National Park.

== Conservation ==
Pherosphaera hookeriana is listed under the old name Microstrobos niphophilus as vulnerable under the Tasmanian Threatened species protection act of 1995, after having its classification updated from rare in 2001. The chance of the whole species being lost in a single disaster is very unlikely, given its wide geographic range, however the chance of local extinction in individual stands or subpopulations appears to be increasing (the Lake Mackenzie fire in early 2016 is evidence of the threat fire poses to montane conifers). Populations at lower altitudes closer to more flammable vegetation communities are considered to be at extreme risk of fire damage over the coming decades. Another prominent issue is that anecdotal reports suggest that the rate of seedling germination and establishment is extremely low. The possibility that many of the stands of this species are clonal in combination with the breeding strategy, could potentially set a limit on viable seeds in some areas. Climate change and the trends towards a warmer climate, with a greater chance of extreme events such as drought and fires, are likely to have a direct and adverse effect on populations of Pherosphaera hookeriana. Severe declines or local extinctions in more susceptible regions are predicted to occur by the end of the century.
