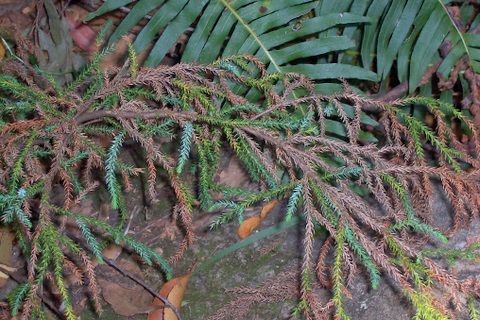
- Pherosphaera fitzgeraldii with Blechnum fern in the background

Conservation status
- Critically Endangered (IUCN 3.1)

Scientific classification
- Kingdom: Plantae
- Clade: Tracheophytes
- Clade: Gymnosperms
- Division: Pinophyta
- Class: Pinopsida
- Order: Araucariales
- Family: Podocarpaceae
- Genus: Pherosphaera
- Species: P. fitzgeraldii

Binomial name
- Pherosphaera fitzgeraldii (F.Muell.) F.Muell. ex Hook.f.

Synonyms
- Dacrydium fitzgeraldii F.Muell.; Microstrobos fitzgeraldii (F.Muell.) J.Garden & L.A.S.Johnson

= Pherosphaera fitzgeraldii =

Species of conifer

Pherosphaera fitzgeraldii, commonly known as the Blue Mountains pine or dwarf mountain pine is a critically endangered species of shrubby conifer in the family Podocarpaceae. It is found only in New South Wales, Australia. The entire natural habitat is in the Blue Mountains, from Katoomba to Wentworth Falls, growing almost exclusively in the splash zones of waterfalls, and on the southern aspect of sandstone nearby.

It was first described by Ferdinand von Mueller in his 1881 work Fragmenta Phytographiae Australiae as Dacrydium fitzgeraldii, naming it after its collector, one R. Fitzgerald. It was renamed Microstrobos fitzgeraldii by Lawrie Johnson and Garden in 1951, and Pherosphaera fitzgeraldii by Joseph Dalton Hooker in 1882.

Pherosphaera fitzgeraldii grows as a small shrub to 1 m (3 ft) high. The branchlets droop and bear tiny narrow leaves 2 or 3 mm in length.

Only 7 populations, containing a total of 455 individual plants are known. This conifer may be threatened by habitat loss, due to increased urbanization on the plateau. In the past hundred years, stream water quality has deteriorated, due to urban sprawl in the Blue Mountains. However, the population of Pherosphaera fitzgeraldii seems to have been stable over the last fifty years.
