= Falcatifolium angustum =

Conservation status
- Endangered (IUCN 3.1)

Scientific classification
- Kingdom: Plantae
- Clade: Tracheophytes
- Clade: Gymnosperms
- Division: Pinophyta
- Class: Pinopsida
- Order: Araucariales
- Family: Podocarpaceae
- Genus: Falcatifolium
- Species: F. angustum

Binomial name
- Falcatifolium angustum de Laub.

Species of conifer

Falcatifolium angustum is a species of conifer in the family Podocarpaceae, endemic to Malaysia. It can grow up to twenty meters tall. It is threatened by habitat loss, in 1998 it was known to exist only in two locations, both in Sarawak.
