= Falcatifolium sleumeri =

Conservation status
- Near Threatened (IUCN 3.1)

Scientific classification
- Kingdom: Plantae
- Clade: Tracheophytes
- Clade: Gymnosperms
- Division: Pinophyta
- Class: Pinopsida
- Order: Araucariales
- Family: Podocarpaceae
- Genus: Falcatifolium
- Species: F. sleumeri

Binomial name
- Falcatifolium sleumeri de Laub. & Silba

Species of conifer

Falcatifolium sleumeri is a species of conifer in the family Podocarpaceae. It is endemic to a small area in the far west of Western New Guinea (Papua).
