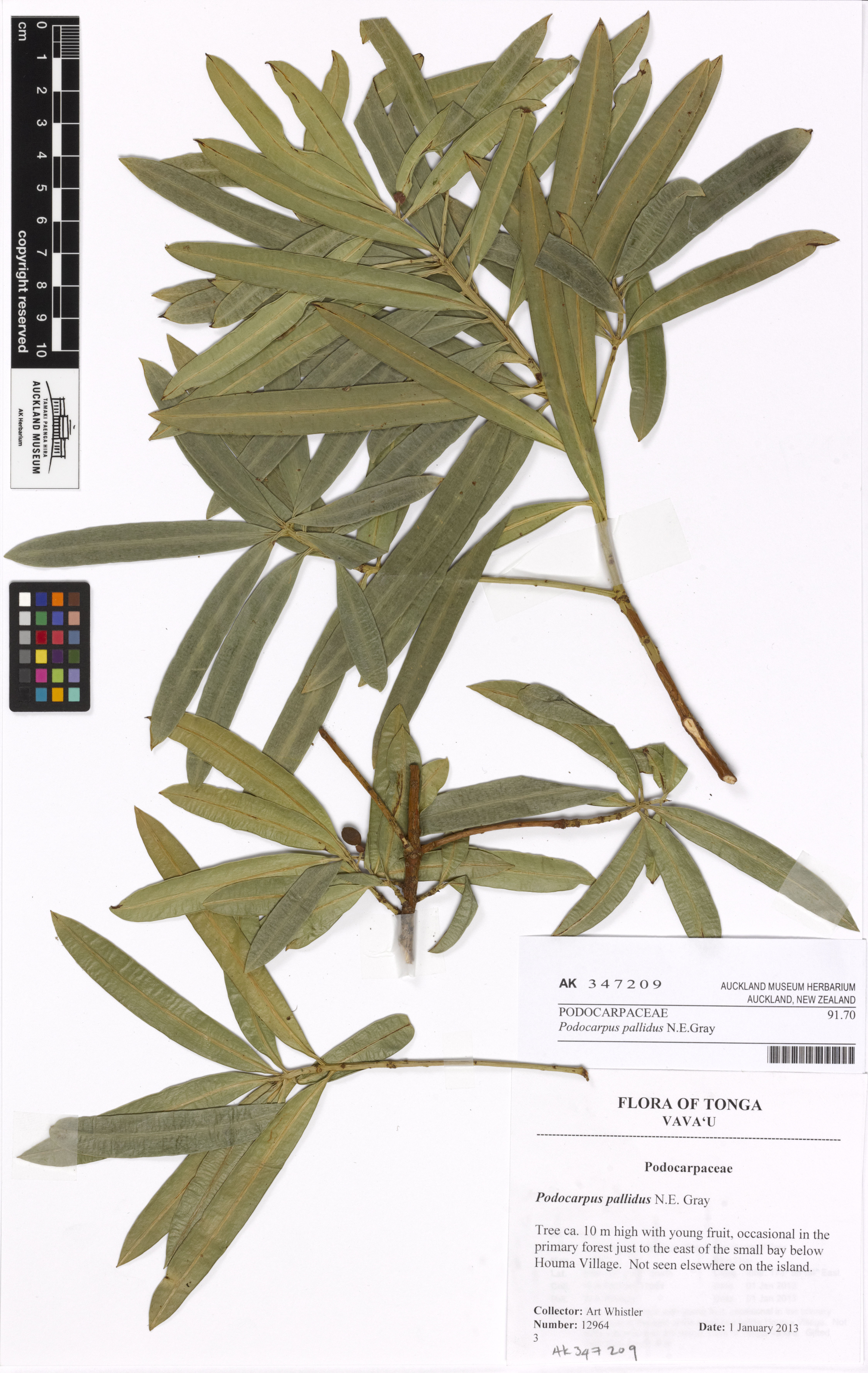

Conservation status
- Vulnerable (IUCN 3.1)

Scientific classification
- Kingdom: Plantae
- Clade: Tracheophytes
- Clade: Gymnosperms
- Division: Pinophyta
- Class: Pinopsida
- Order: Araucariales
- Family: Podocarpaceae
- Genus: Podocarpus
- Species: P. pallidus

Binomial name
- Podocarpus pallidus N.E.Gray

= Podocarpus pallidus =

Species of conifer

Podocarpus pallidus is a species of conifer in the family Podocarpaceae. It is a shrub or tree endemic to the islands of ʻEua and Vavaʻu in Tonga.

The species was described by Netta Elizabeth Gray in 1959.
