= Agathis orbicula =

Sarawak kauri

Conservation status
- Endangered (IUCN 3.1)

Scientific classification
- Kingdom: Plantae
- Clade: Tracheophytes
- Clade: Gymnosperms
- Division: Pinophyta
- Class: Pinopsida
- Order: Araucariales
- Family: Araucariaceae
- Genus: Agathis
- Species: A. orbicula

Binomial name
- Agathis orbicula de Laub.
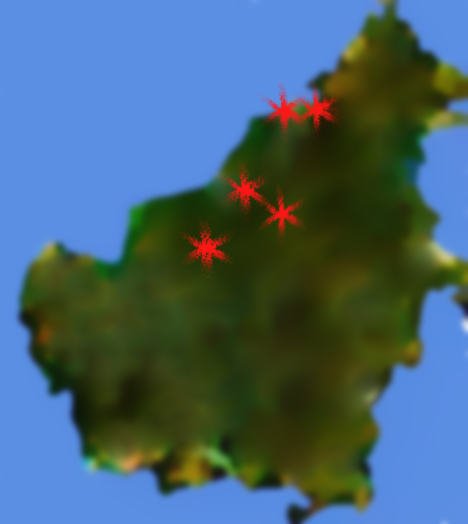
- Major populations of Agathis orbicula

Species of conifer

Agathis orbicula, the Sarawak kauri, is a coniferous tree in the family Araucariaceae, endemic to the island of Borneo. It is found scattered throughout tropical rainforests and Kerangas forests. It is commonly found on hills and plateaus. The species is facing a high risk of extinction due to its scattered distribution and the decline in quality of its habitat.

== Description ==
Agathis orbicula is a medium-sized tree of up to 40 metres (130 ft). Like all Agathis, Sarawak kauri is generally possessed of a large, straight trunk. The trunk is usually branchless until close to the top where branches are retained which form a globular crown.

The leaves range in shape from ovangular to circular, and are glaucous on their underside. The leaves are roughly two by three centimetres; juvenile leaves are much larger by comparison and are roughly twice the size of adult leaves. It can be inferred that the tree is similar in its appearance to other large trees of the genus, particularly Agathis borneensis. This is because it is likely A. orbicula was mistaken for A. borneensis.

=== Cones ===
The cones that the tree produces are approximately seven by five centimetres and display imbrication whilst the pollen cones are generally twelve by five millimetres, being quite small and having a bumpy texture due to the exposed microsporophylls. The cones are among the smallest in the genus Agathis when compared to the significantly larger pollen cones of other species such as Agathis robusta; its cones are in the millimetre range making them quite small.

=== Bark ===
The bark is described as being a deep brown and flaking off of the tree in irregular pieces and plates; it is also smooth and shiny. The underside of the bark is a reddish-brown colour with a granular texture and accompanied by a yellow resin produced by the sap of the tree.

=== Timber ===
The wood of the Sarawak kauri is generally particularly straight-grained, and the colour of the timber beneath can range from a straw colour to reddish brown. It produces an attractive timber that is easily worked. However, due to an extreme scarcity and a loss of habitat the tree does not seem to be in use or ever have been used for commercial purposes.
