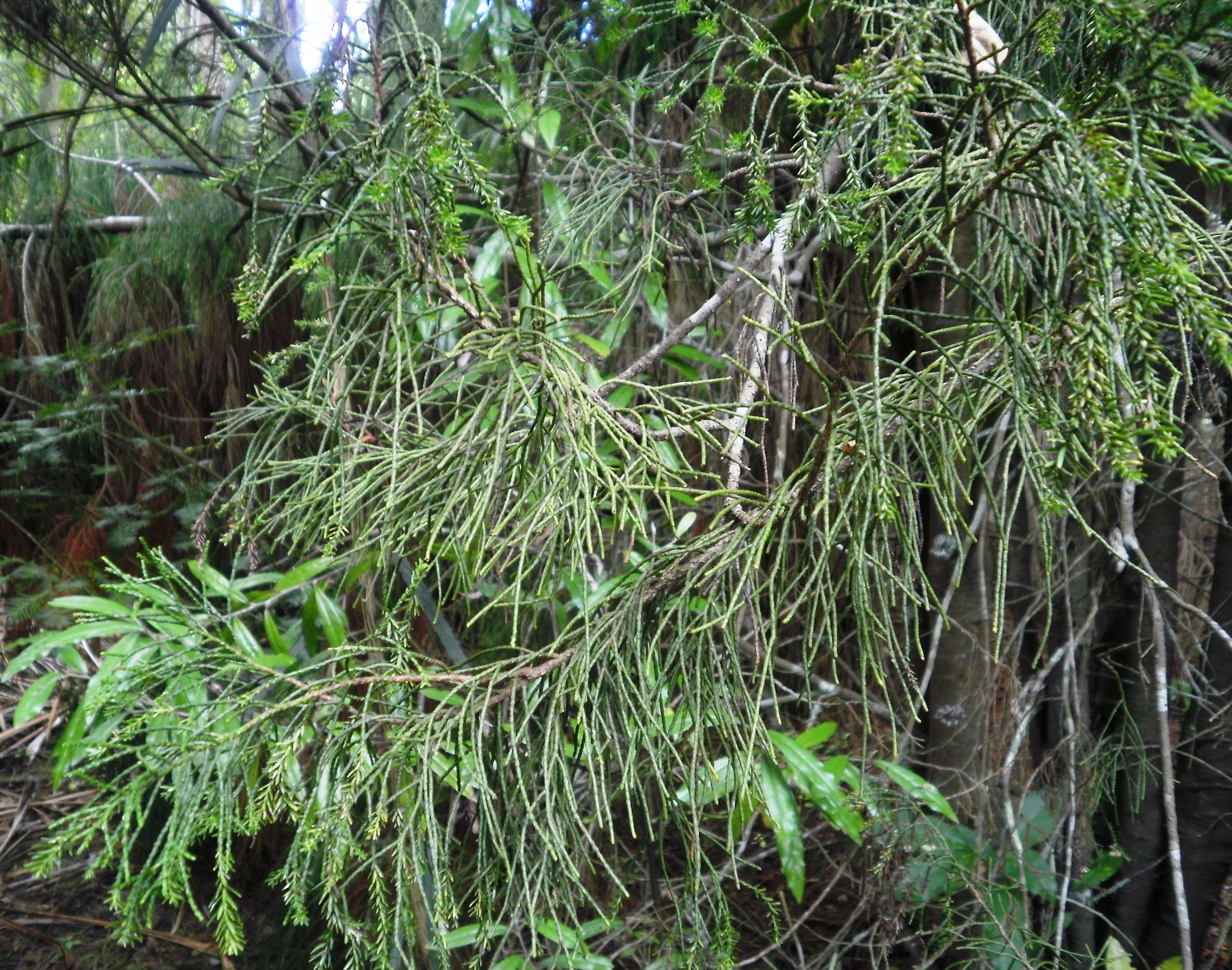
- Manoao foliage

Conservation status
- Least Concern (IUCN 3.1)

Scientific classification
- Kingdom: Plantae
- Clade: Tracheophytes
- Clade: Gymnosperms
- Division: Pinophyta
- Class: Pinopsida
- Order: Araucariales
- Family: Podocarpaceae
- Genus: Manoao; Molloy
- Species: M. colensoi

Binomial name
- Manoao colensoi (Hook.) Molloy

Synonyms
- Dacrydium colensoi Hook.; Dacrydium westlandicum Kirk; Lagarostrobos colensoi (Hook.) Quinn; Lepidothamnus colensoi (Hook.) de Laub.

= Manoao =

Genus of conifers endemic to New Zealand

Manoao (/ˈmɑːnoʊaʊ/ MAH-noh-ow) is a monotypic genus of conifer in the family Podocarpaceae. The single species, M. colensoi, the manoao (from Māori), silver pine, Westland pine, or white silver pine, is endemic to New Zealand. Before 1996 it was classified in genus Dacrydium or Lagarostrobos, but has recently been recognised as a distinct genus; some botanists still treat it in Lagarostrobos on the basis that it is not phylogenetically distinct from that genus. In molecular phylogenetic analyses Manoao was found to be related to Parasitaxus (a parasitic and monotypic genus from New Caledonia) and Lagarostrobos (a single species from Tasmania when narrowly defined), but their exact relationships are unresolved.

Manoao colensoi is a slow-growing tree up to 15 m (49 ft) in height, in shady, wet areas of New Zealand. It is a source of fine, straight and durable timber.

== Distribution ==
M. colensoi can be found in the North Island from Te Paki southwards to Mount Ruapehu. However it is common only in the central North Island. It is also found in the western South Island.
