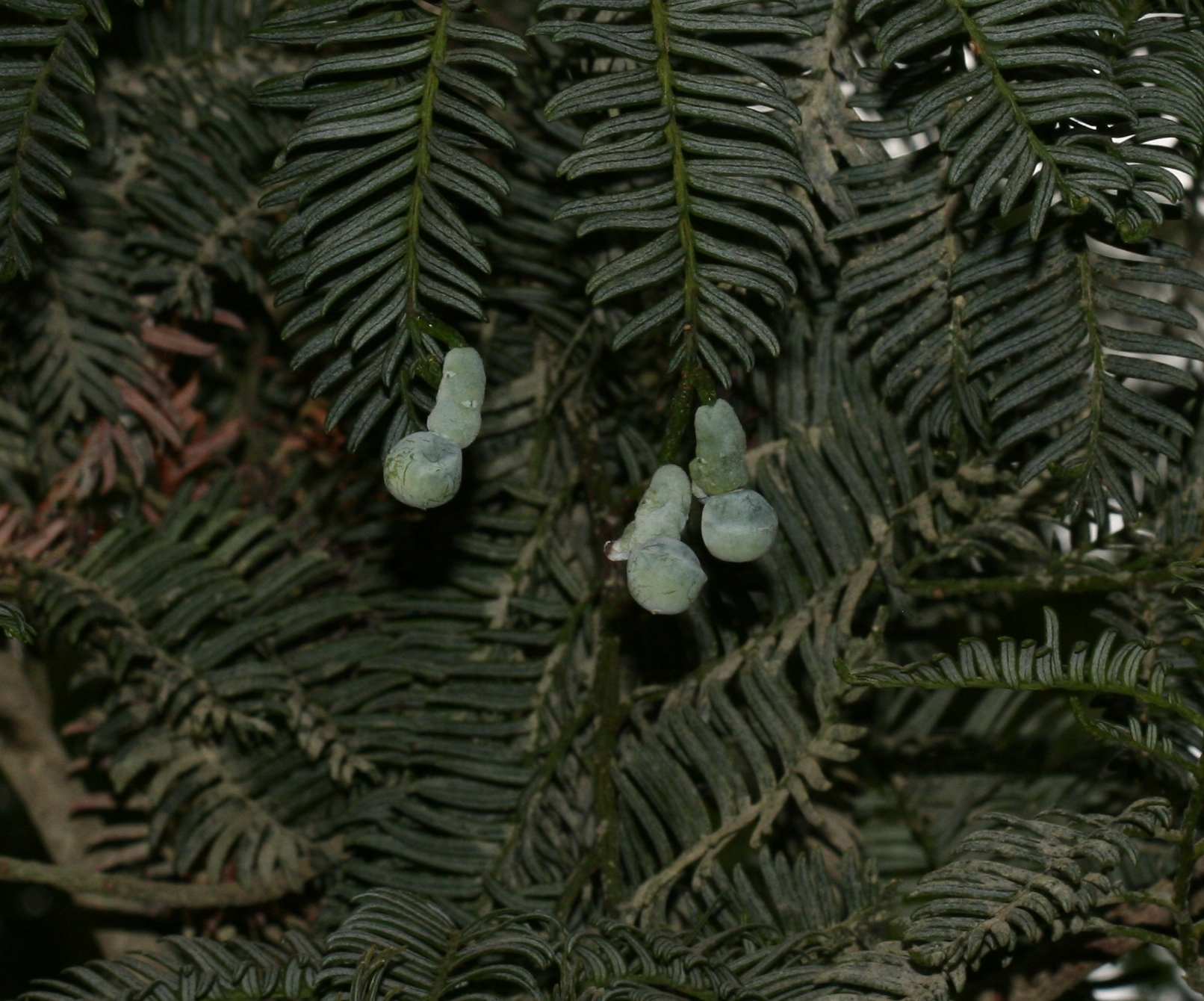

Conservation status
- Least Concern (IUCN 3.1)

Scientific classification
- Kingdom: Plantae
- Clade: Tracheophytes
- Clade: Gymnosperms
- Division: Pinophyta
- Class: Pinopsida
- Order: Araucariales
- Family: Podocarpaceae
- Genus: Acmopyle
- Species: A. pancheri

Binomial name
- Acmopyle pancheri (Brongn. & Gris) Pilg.

Synonyms
- Acmopyle alba Buchholz; Dacrydium pancheri Brongn. & Gris; Nageia pancheri (Brongn. & Gris) Kuntze; Podocarpus pectinatus Pancher ex Brongn. & Gris

= Acmopyle pancheri =

Species of conifer

Acmopyle pancheri is a species of conifer in the family Podocarpaceae. It is a tree that grows 5–25 m tall, endemic to New Caledonia.
