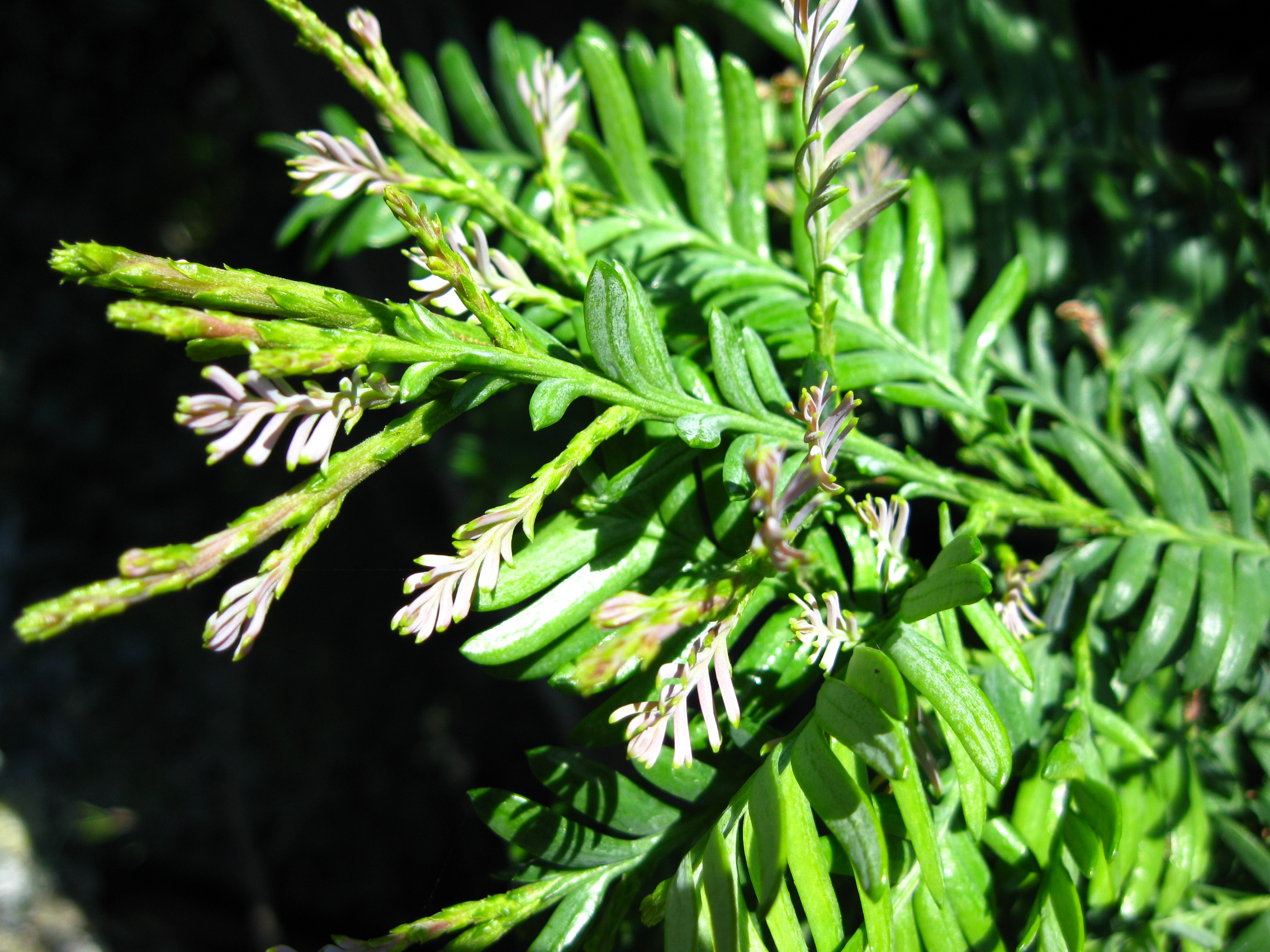

Scientific classification
- Kingdom: Plantae
- Clade: Embryophytes
- Clade: Tracheophytes
- Clade: Gymnosperms
- Division: Pinophyta
- Class: Pinopsida
- Order: Araucariales
- Family: Podocarpaceae
- Genus: Acmopyle; Pilg.

Type species
- Acmopyle pancheri (Brongniart & Gris) Pilg.

Species
- 2 – see text

= Acmopyle =

Genus of conifers

Acmopyle is a genus of conifers belonging to the family Podocarpaceae. It includes two species of trees, each endemic to separate islands of the southwestern Pacific Ocean.

== Accepted species ==
As of June 2025, Plants of the World Online accepts the following two species:

- Acmopyle pancheri (Brongn. & Gris) Pilg. – New Caledonia (endemic)
- Acmopyle sahniana Buchholz & N.E.Gray – Fiji (endemic)
