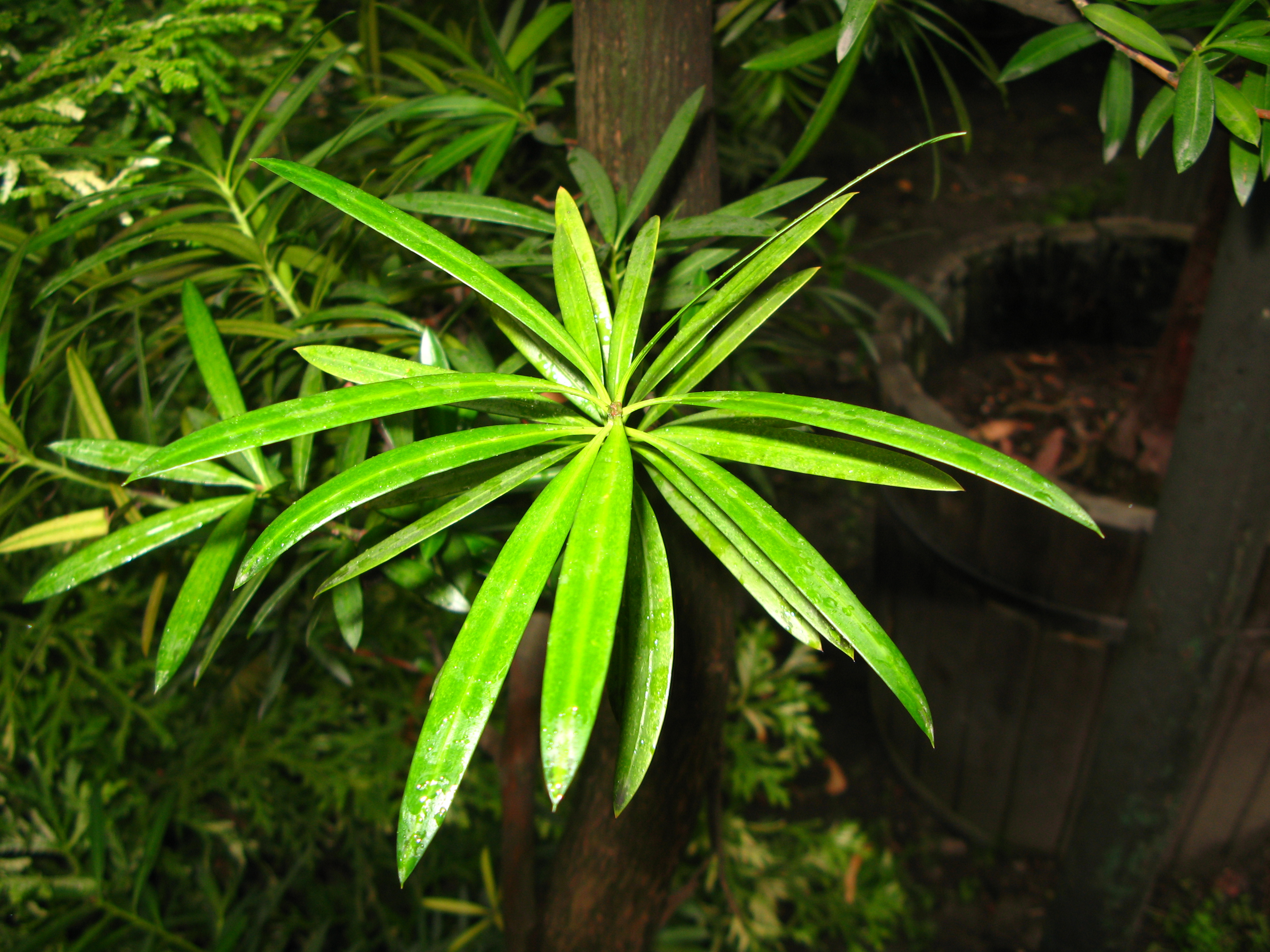

Conservation status
- Least Concern (IUCN 3.1)
- CITES Appendix III

Scientific classification
- Kingdom: Plantae
- Clade: Tracheophytes
- Clade: Gymnosperms
- Division: Pinophyta
- Class: Pinopsida
- Order: Araucariales
- Family: Podocarpaceae
- Genus: Podocarpus
- Species: P. neriifolius

Binomial name
- Podocarpus neriifolius D.Don (1824)

Synonyms
- Margbensonia neriifolia (D.Don) A.V.Bobrov & Melikyan (1998); Nageia neriifolia (D.Don) Kuntze (1891); Nageia endlicheriana (Carrière) Kuntze (1891); Podocarpus annamiensis var. hainanensis Gaussen (1976), without type.; Podocarpus endlicherianus Carrière (1855); Podocarpus macrophyllus var. acuminatissimus E.Pritz. (1900)

= Podocarpus neriifolius =

Species of conifer

Podocarpus neriifolius, commonly known as the Jati Brown pine, is a species of conifer in the family Podocarpaceae. It is native to Nepal, eastern India, and Bangladesh through parts of Indochina (Myanmar, Thailand, Cambodia, and Vietnam) and Malesia (Peninsular Malaysia, Sumatra, Borneo, Sulawesi, and the Philippines).

Previously, the species was thought to range eastwards as far as Fiji. David J. de Laubenfels identified the eastern populations from New Guinea to Fiji as a separate species, Podocarpus idenburgensis, distinguished by narrow, acute leaves.

== Botany ==
It grows 10–15 metres (33–49 feet) tall, though very occasionally taller, in tropical and subtropical wet closed forests, between 650 m (2,130 ft) and 1,600 m (5,200 ft)elevation. In Cambodia however it grows in a dwarf form some 2–4 m (6 ft 7 in – 13 ft 1 in) tall, at Bokor, some 1,000 m (3,300 ft) elevation. It can grow in a variety of places like rocky hill-tops, swampy forest, kerangas, on limestone and sandstone soils.

It has a yellowish wood, used in construction in Cambodia (called srô:l in Khmer), where it is graded 2nd category (not as good as 1st, but above others).
