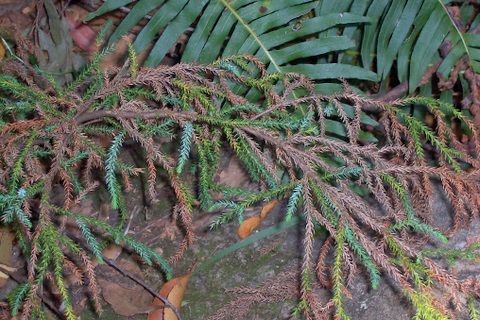
- Pherosphaera fitzgeraldii

Scientific classification
- Kingdom: Plantae
- Clade: Embryophytes
- Clade: Tracheophytes
- Clade: Gymnosperms
- Division: Pinophyta
- Class: Pinopsida
- Order: Araucariales
- Family: Podocarpaceae
- Genus: Pherosphaera; W.Archer bis

Type species
- Pherosphaera hookeriana W.Archer bis

Synonyms
- Microstrobos J.Garden & L.A.S.Johnson

= Pherosphaera =

Genus of plants

Pherosphaera is a genus of conifers in the family Podocarpaceae.

Its native range is Southeastern Australia.

Both species are shrubs. They are dioecious, with male and female cones on separate plants.

== Species ==
Species:

- Pherosphaera fitzgeraldii (F.Muell.) F.Muell. ex Hook.f.
- Pherosphaera hookeriana W.Archer bis
