= Falcatifolium taxoides =

Conservation status
- Least Concern (IUCN 3.1)

Scientific classification
- Kingdom: Plantae
- Clade: Tracheophytes
- Clade: Gymnosperms
- Division: Pinophyta
- Class: Pinopsida
- Order: Araucariales
- Family: Podocarpaceae
- Genus: Falcatifolium
- Species: F. taxoides

Binomial name
- Falcatifolium taxoides (Brongn. & Gris) de Laub.

Synonyms
- Dacrydium taxoides Brongn. & Gris (1866); Nageia taxoides (Brongn. & Gris) Kuntze; Pinus falciformis Parl.; Podocarpus taxodioides Carrière; Podocarpus taxodioides var. gracilis Carrière

Species of conifer from New Caledonia

Falcatifolium taxoides is a species of coniferous tree in the family Podocarpaceae. It is endemic to New Caledonia, and is the only known host of its non-photosynthetic, possibly parasitic relative, Parasitaxus usta.

== Taxonomy ==
The species was first described as Dacrydium taxoides by Adolphe-Théodore Brongniart and Jean Antoine Arthur Gris in 1866. In 1969 David John de Laubenfels described the genus Falcatifolium and placed the species there as F. taxoides. Falcatifolium means 'with sickle-shaped leaves', while taxoides means 'yew-like' (resembling Taxus).
