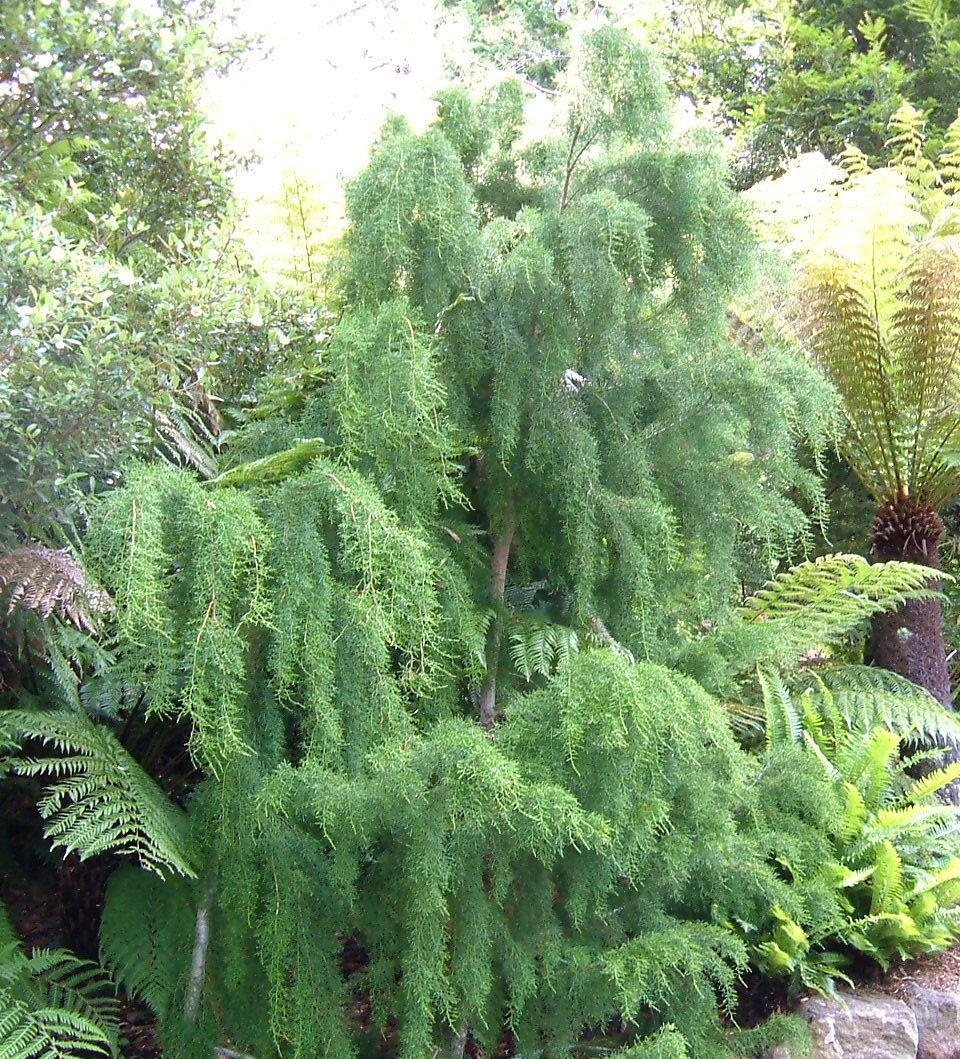
- Huon pine in a Tasmanian botanical garden

Conservation status
- Least Concern (IUCN 3.1)

Scientific classification
- Kingdom: Plantae
- Clade: Tracheophytes
- Clade: Gymnosperms
- Division: Pinophyta
- Class: Pinopsida
- Order: Araucariales
- Family: Podocarpaceae
- Genus: Lagarostrobos; Quinn
- Species: L. franklinii

Binomial name
- Lagarostrobos franklinii (Hook.f.) Quinn

= Lagarostrobos =

Lagarostrobos Temporal range: Paleocene to recent 66–0 Ma

Genus of conifers

Lagarostrobos franklinii, the Huon pine or Macquarie pine, is a species of conifer in the family Podocarpaceae, native to the wet southwestern corner of Tasmania, Australia. It is the sole species in the genus Lagarostrobos; one former species, L. colensoi (endemic to New Zealand) formerly included has been transferred to a new genus Manoao. The genus was also formerly included in a broader circumscription of the genus Dacrydium.

In molecular phylogenetic analyses Lagorostrobos was found to be related to Parasitaxus (a parasitic and monotypic genus from New Caledonia) and Manoao, but their exact relationships are unresolved.

The wood has a golden-yellow colour, fine grain, and natural oils that provide resistance to decay. Methyl eugenol contributes to the timber's characteristic odour and perservative properties.

It has been planted in the grounds of Crathes Castle, Aberdeenshire, Scotland and has done well. Two healthy specimens can also be found at Torosay Castle, Isle of Mull.

== Description ==
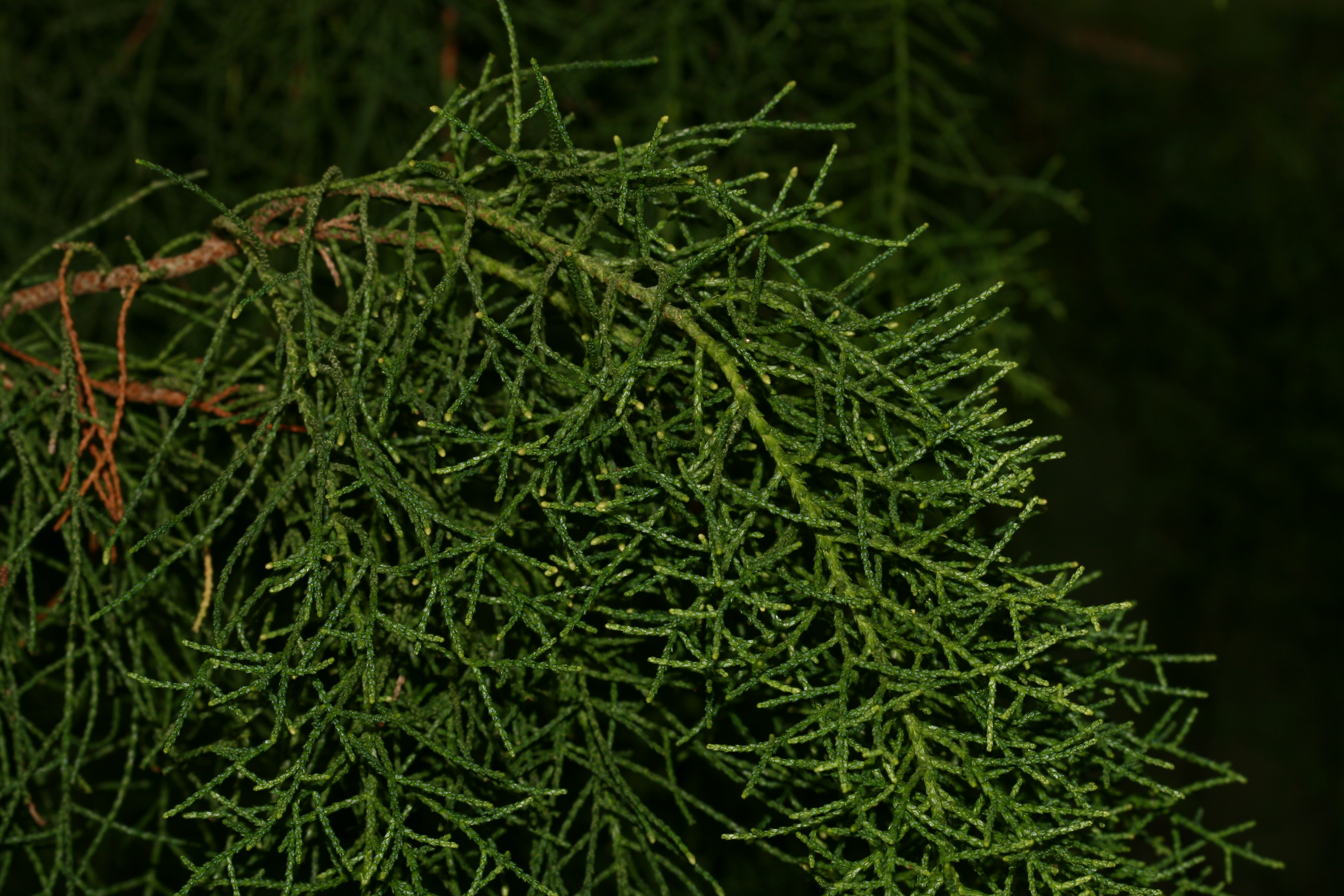
Close-up of Huon pine foliage

The Huon pine is a slow-growing, but long-lived tree; some living specimens of this tree are in excess of 2,000 years old. It grows to 10 to 20 metres (33 to 66 ft) tall, exceptionally reaching 30 m (98 ft), with arching branches and pendulous branchlets. The leaves are spirally arranged, very small and scale-like, 1 to 3 mm (0.039 to 0.118 in) long, covering the shoots completely. It is dioecious, with male (pollen) and female (seed) cones on separate plants. The male cones are yellow, 5 to 8 mm (0.20 to 0.31 in) long and 1 to 2 mm (0.039 to 0.079 in) broad. The mature seed cones are highly modified, berry-like, with 5 to 10 lax, open scales which mature in six-to-eight months, with one seed 2 to 2.5 mm (0.079 to 0.098 in) long on each scale. Unlike the closely related New Zealand genus Manoao, the scales do not become fleshy and are water-dispersed, not bird-dispersed.

Based on herbarium specimens the extent of occurrence is estimated to be around 13,363 km^{2} (5,159 sq mi) with an estimated area of occupancy of 13,363 km^{2} (5,159 sq mi). The actual area of occupancy is estimated to range from 2,500 ha (6,200 acres) (Gibson 1991) to as much as 10,500 ha (26,000 acres) (Parks and Wildlife Service Tasmania 2006).

== Age ==
Huon pines are some of the oldest living organisms on the Earth.

A stand of trees in excess of 10,500 years old was found in 1955 in western Tasmania on Mount Read. Each of the trees in this stand is a genetically identical male that has reproduced vegetatively. Although no single tree in this stand is of that age, the stand itself as a single organism has existed that long.

Individual trees in the clonal patch have been listed as having ages of 2,000 or even to 3,000 years old.

Because of the long life of individual trees, tree rings from Huon Pine have been used for dendrochronology to establish a record of climate variation.

== Conservation ==
An estimated 15% of its habitat has been lost through inundation for hydroelectric schemes and to fire over the past 100 years or so. Extensive logging in the past has removed nearly all large trees, but there is regrowth nearly everywhere. One stand of the species has been made available for access to craft wood from dead and downed timber under a strict licensing system. It is illegal to cut living trees.

== See also ==
- List of superlative trees
