= Monotypic taxon =

Taxonomic group with only one subordinate taxon

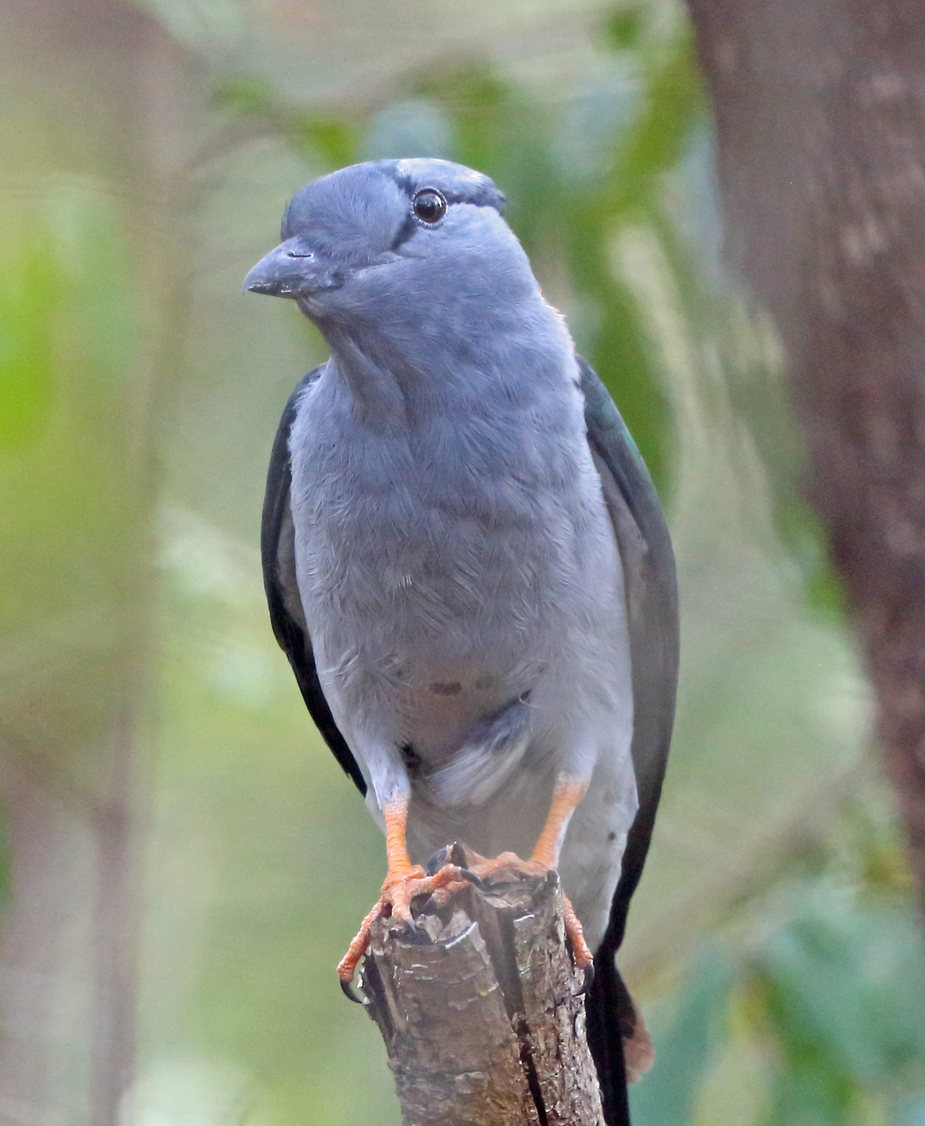
The cuckoo-roller is the sole member of its genus, family, and order.

In biology, for ranks such as genus or family, a monotypic taxon is a taxonomic group (taxon) that contains only one immediately subordinate extant taxon. In the case of genera, the term "unispecific" or "monospecific" is sometimes preferred. In botanical nomenclature, a monotypic genus is a genus in the special case in which a genus and a single extant species are simultaneously described. The term monotypic may be used somewhat differently for species, where a monotypic species may be the only extant species in its genus.

== Theoretical implications ==
The hierarchy of biological classification's eight major taxonomic ranks. Intermediate minor rankings are not shown.

Monotypic taxa present several important theoretical challenges in biological classification. One key issue is known as "Gregg's Paradox": if a single species is the only member of multiple hierarchical levels (for example, being the only species in its genus, which is the only genus in its family), then each level needs a distinct definition to maintain logical structure. Otherwise, the different taxonomic ranks become effectively identical, which creates problems for organizing biological diversity in a hierarchical system.

When taxonomists identify a monotypic taxon, this often reflects uncertainty about its relationships rather than true evolutionary isolation. This uncertainty is evident in many cases across different species. For instance, the diatom Licmophora juergensii is placed in a monotypic genus because scientists have not yet found clear evidence of its relationships to other species.

Some taxonomists argue against monotypic taxa because they reduce the information content of biological classifications. As taxonomists Backlund and Bremer explain in their critique, "'Monotypic' taxa do not provide any information about the relationships of the immediately subordinate taxon". When a monotypic taxon is sister to a single larger group, it might be merged into that group; however, when it is sister to multiple other groups, it may need to remain separate to maintain a natural classification.

From a cladistic perspective, which focuses on shared derived characteristics to determine evolutionary relationships, the theoretical status of monotypic taxa is complex. Some argue that they can only be justified when relationships cannot be resolved through synapomorphies (shared derived characteristics); otherwise, they would necessarily exclude related species and thus be paraphyletic. However, others contend that while most taxonomic groups can be classified as either monophyletic (containing all descendants of a common ancestor) or paraphyletic (excluding some descendants), these concepts do not apply to monotypic taxa because they contain only a single member.

Monotypic taxa are part of a broader challenge in biological classification known as aphyly – situations in which evolutionary relationships are poorly supported by evidence. This includes both monotypic groups and cases where traditional groupings are found to be artificial. Understanding how monotypic taxa fit into this bigger picture helps identify areas needing further research.

The German lichenologist Robert Lücking suggests that the common application of the term monotypic is frequently misleading "since each taxon by definition contains exactly one type and is hence 'monotypic', regardless of the total number of units", and suggests using "monospecific" for a genus with a single species, and "monotaxonomic" for a taxon containing only one unit.

== Conservation implications ==
Species in monotypic genera tend to be more threatened with extinction than average species. Studies have found this pattern to be particularly pronounced in amphibians, of which about 6.56% of monotypic genera are critically endangered, compared to birds and mammals, of which around 4.54% and 4.02%, respectively, of monotypic genera face critical endangerment.

Studies have found that extinction of monotypic genera is particularly associated with island species. Among 25 documented extinctions of monotypic genera studied, 22 occurred on islands, with flightless birds being particularly vulnerable to human impact.

== Examples ==
Just as the term monotypic is used to describe a taxon including only one subdivision, the contained taxon can also be referred to as monotypic within the higher-level taxon, e.g., a genus monotypic within a family. Some examples of monotypic groups are:

=== Plants ===
- The division Ginkgophyta is monotypic, containing the single class Ginkgoopsida. In turn, Ginkgo biloba is the sole extant member of Ginkgophyta.
- The species Amborella trichopoda is considered to be the most basal extant flowering plant and is placed as the sole member of the order Amborellales.
- The conifer Sciadopitys verticillata is the only extant species in the genus Sciadopitys and family Sciadopityaceae. Multiple other conifer genera are monotypic, but are members of larger families; examples include Cathaya, Diselma, Fitzroya, Glyptostrobus, Metasequoia, Microcachrys, Nothotsuga, Parasitaxus, Saxegothaea, Sequoia, Sequoiadendron, Sundacarpus, Tetraclinis, Thujopsis and Wollemia.
- The flowering plant Breonadia salicina is the only species in the monotypic genus Breonadia.
- Cephalotus follicularis, the Albany pitcher plant, is the sole member of the family Cephalotaceae.
- The water lily species Euryale ferox is the sole extant member of the genus Euryale.

=== Animals ===
- The monito del monte is the only extant member of the order Microbiotheria.
- The walrus is the only member of the genus Odobenus and the only extant member of the family Odobenidae.
- The red panda is the only extant member of the family Ailuridae.
- The platypus is the only member of the monotypic genus Ornithorhynchus and the sole extant member of the family Ornithorhynchidae.
- The aye-aye is the only extant member of the genus Daubentonia and the family Daubentoniidae.
- The aardvark is the only extant member of the genus Orycteropus, the family Orycteropodidae, and the order Tubulidentata.
- The madrone butterfly is the only species in the monotypic genus Eucheira. However, there are two subspecies of this butterfly, E. socialis socialis and E. socialis westwoodi, which means the species E. socialis is not monotypic.
- Delphinapterus leucas, the beluga whale, is the only member of its genus and lacks subspecies.
- Dugong dugon is the only species in the monotypic genus Dugong.
- Homo sapiens (humans) are monotypic, as they have too little genetic diversity to have any accepted living subspecies.
- The maned wolf, a large canid, is the only species in the monotypic genus Chrysocyon.
- The narwhal, a medium-sized cetacean, is the only member of the monotypic genus Monodon.
- The palmchat is the only member of the genus Dulus and family Dulidae.
- The salamanderfish (Lepidogalaxias salamandroides) is the only member of the order Lepidogalaxiiformes, which is the sister group to the other euteleosts.
- Ozichthys albimaculosus, the cream-spotted cardinalfish, which is found in tropical Australia and southern New Guinea, is the sole member of the genus Ozichthys.
- The bearded reedling is the only species in the monotypic genus Panurus and the monotypic family Panuridae. The species has three subspecies, making it not strictly monotypic.
- The reindeer is the only species in the monotypic genus Rangifer.
- The sloth bear is the only species in the monotypic genus Melursus.
- The swordfish is the only species in the monotypic genus Xiphias and the monotypic family Xiphiidae.
- The orca, or killer whale, is the sole extant species in the genus Orcinus.
- The shoebill is the only species in the monotypic genus Balaeniceps and the sole extant member of the family Balaenicipitidae.
- The Dall's porpoise is the only species in the monotypic genus Phocoenoides.
- The short-beaked echidna is the only species of the monotypic genus Tachyglossus. The species has five subspecies, making it not strictly monotypic.
- The mangrove horseshoe crab, also known as the round-tailed horseshoe crab, is the only species of the monotypic genus Carcnoscorpius.
- The marine iguana is the only species of the monotypic genus Amblyrhynchus.
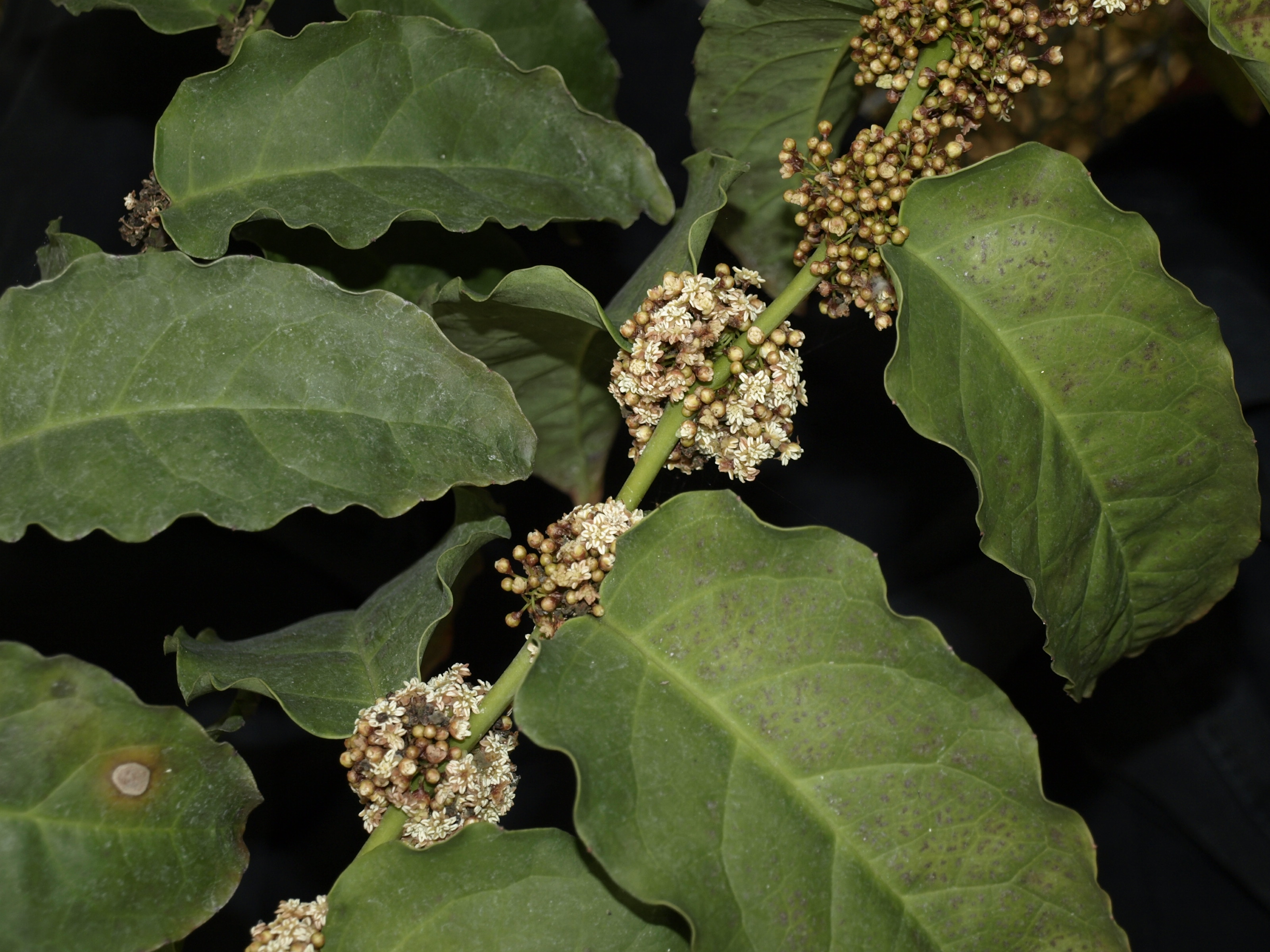
In the order Amborellales, there is only one family, Amborellaceae, and there is only one genus, Amborella, and in this genus there is only one species, Amborella trichopoda.

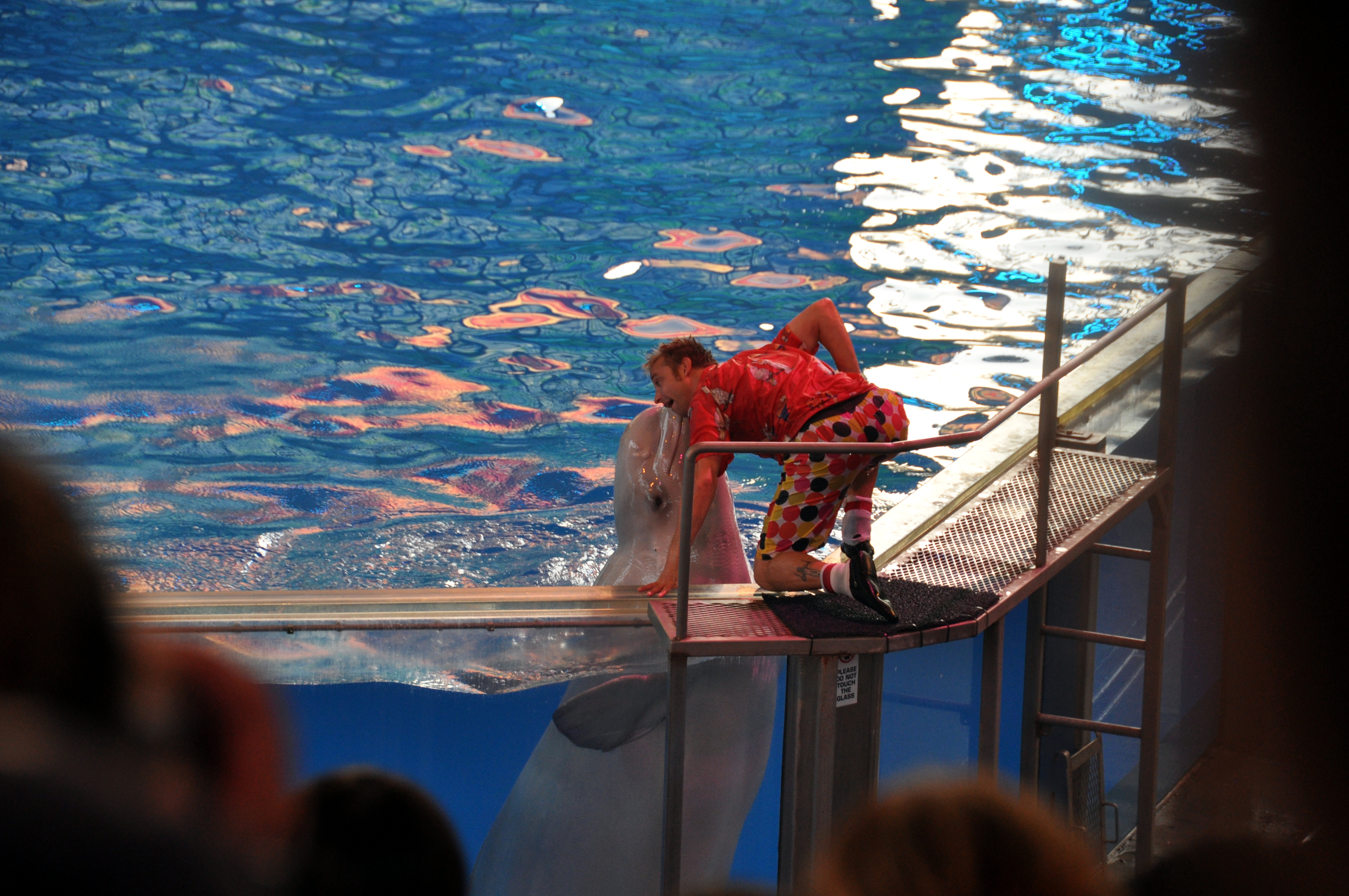
Beluga "kissing" a human trainer; both are monotypical in their genera.

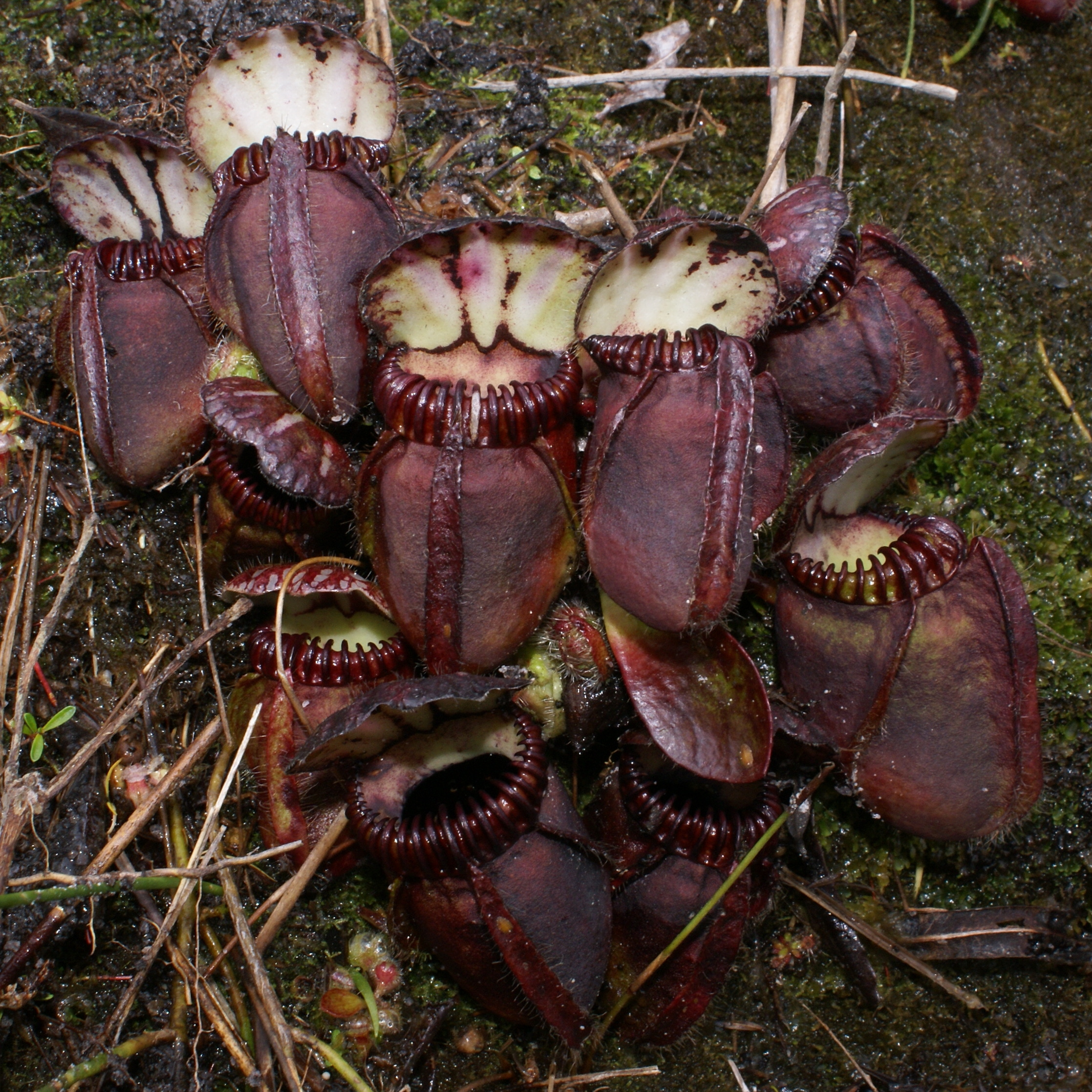
The family Cephalotaceae has only one genus, Cephalotus, which contains only one species, Cephalotus follicularis, the Australian pitcher plant.

=== Other ===
- The protist Picomonas judraskeda is the only known species in the phylum Picozoa.

== See also ==
- Glossary of scientific naming
- Monophyly
