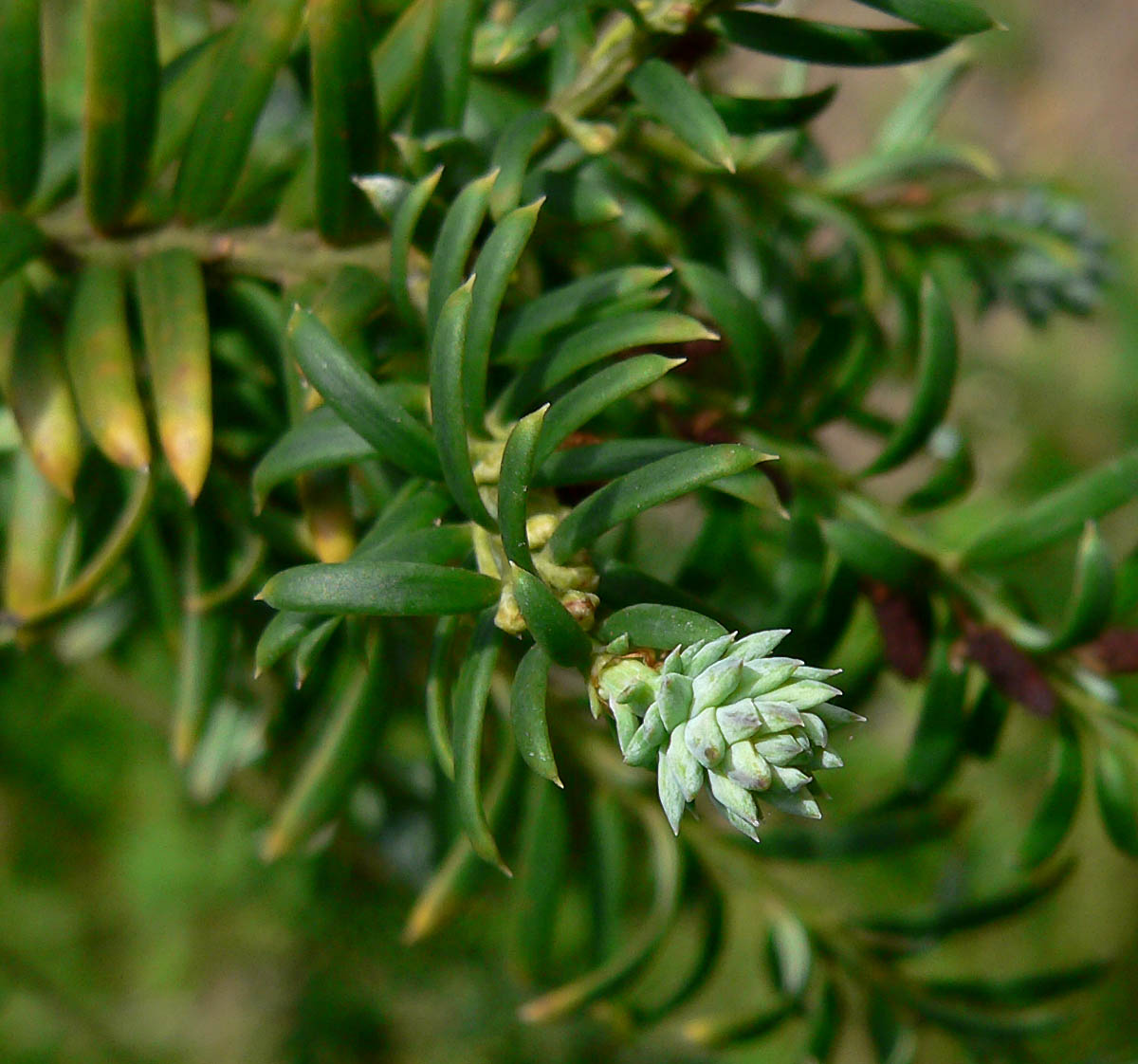

Conservation status
- Near Threatened (IUCN 3.1)

Scientific classification
- Kingdom: Plantae
- Clade: Tracheophytes
- Clade: Gymnosperms
- Division: Pinophyta
- Class: Pinopsida
- Order: Araucariales
- Family: Podocarpaceae
- Genus: Saxegothaea; Lindl.
- Species: S. conspicua

Binomial name
- Saxegothaea conspicua Lindl.

= Saxegothaea =

Species of plant

Saxegothaea is a monotypic genus of conifer in the family Podocarpaceae containing one species, Saxegothaea conspicua. It is a medium-sized tree, native to southern South America. It grows in Chile and Argentina from 35° to 46° South latitude; in its northernmost natural distribution it grows between 800 and 1000 (2600–3300 ft) m above sea level and in the south it lives at sea level. The species is most often known by its genus name, or sometimes as female maniu (a translation of its name in Spanish) and Prince Albert's yew; in South America it is known as mañío hembra or maniú hembra.

The genus name of Saxegothaea is in honour of Franz August Carl Albert Emanuel von Sachsen-Coburg und Gotha (1819–1861), who was the consort of Queen Victoria from their marriage on 10 February 1840 until his death in 1861. Lindley wrote "This remarkable plant, to which His Royal Highness Prince Albert has been pleased to permit one of his titles to be given, and which will probably rank among the most highly valued of our hardy evergreen trees, is a native of the mountains of Patagonia, where it was found by Mr. William Lobb, forming a beautiful tree 30 feet high." When he published the plant in J. Hort. Soc. London vol.6 on page 258 in 1851.

It is a slow-growing, long-lived tree growing to 15–25 m (50–80 ft) tall, with a trunk up to 1 m in diameter. The bark is thin and flaky to scaly, dark purple-brown. The leaves are arranged in an irregular spiral; they are lanceolate, 1.5–3 cm long, 2 mm broad, fairly hard with a prickly spine tip, dark green above, and with two glaucous blue-white stomatal bands below. The cones are 1 cm long, with 15-20 soft scales; usually only 2-4 scales on each cone are fertile, bearing a single seed 3 mm in diameter.

Saxegothaea is endemic to the Valdivian temperate rain forests of southern Chile and adjacent parts of Argentina, where it is generally found in association with Pilgerodendron uviferum and Fitzroya cupressoides.

The wood has a good quality and is used in furniture and barrels.
