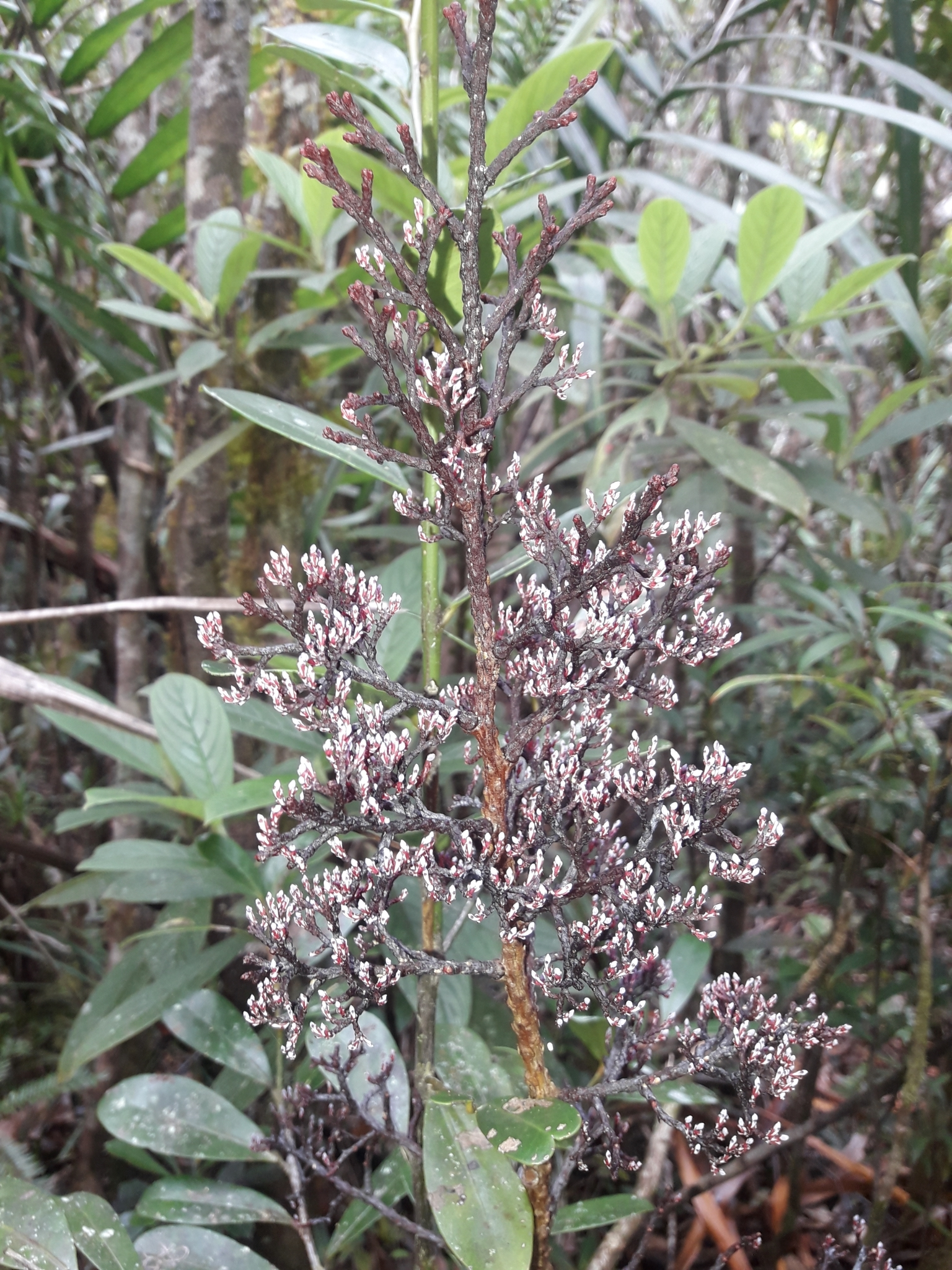

Conservation status
- Vulnerable (IUCN 3.1)

Scientific classification
- Kingdom: Plantae
- Clade: Tracheophytes
- Clade: Gymnosperms
- Division: Pinophyta
- Class: Pinopsida
- Order: Araucariales
- Family: Podocarpaceae
- Genus: Parasitaxus de Laub.
- Species: P. usta

Binomial name
- Parasitaxus usta (Vieill.) de Laub.

Synonyms
- Podocarpus ustus; Dacrydium ustum; Nageia usta; Parasitaxus ustus

= Parasitaxus =

Species of parasitic conifer from New Caledonia

Parasitaxus usta, the corail, also known in French as cèdre rabougri, is a rare species of conifer in the family Podocarpaceae, and the sole species of the monotypic genus Parasitaxus.

== Description ==
It is a woody shrub up to 1.8 metres (5 feet 11 inches) endemic to the remote, densely forested areas of New Caledonia, first discovered and described by Vieillard in 1861. It lacks roots and anchors itself onto the roots of Falcatifolium taxoides, another species in the podocarp family. The first definitive report that it was a parasite was in 1959.

== Taxonomy ==
Molecular phylogenetic analysis also suggest affinities between Parasitaxus and the genera Manoao (New Zealand) and Lagarostrobos (Tasmania). Parasitaxus has been shown to contain high levels of chlorophyll. However, a genome analysis shows that many genes for photosynthesis are missing from the parasite's plastid genome, strongly suggesting that Parasitaxus completely depends on its host for survival. Around 60% of the genes normally present in a podocarp plastid genome were entirely absent or present only as fragments. They were predominantly genes involved in photosynthetic, rather than other plastid processes. There were changes to the structure of the plastid genome that were different from that of other parasitic plants and its podocarp relatives, although these might not be related to its parasitic lifestyle.

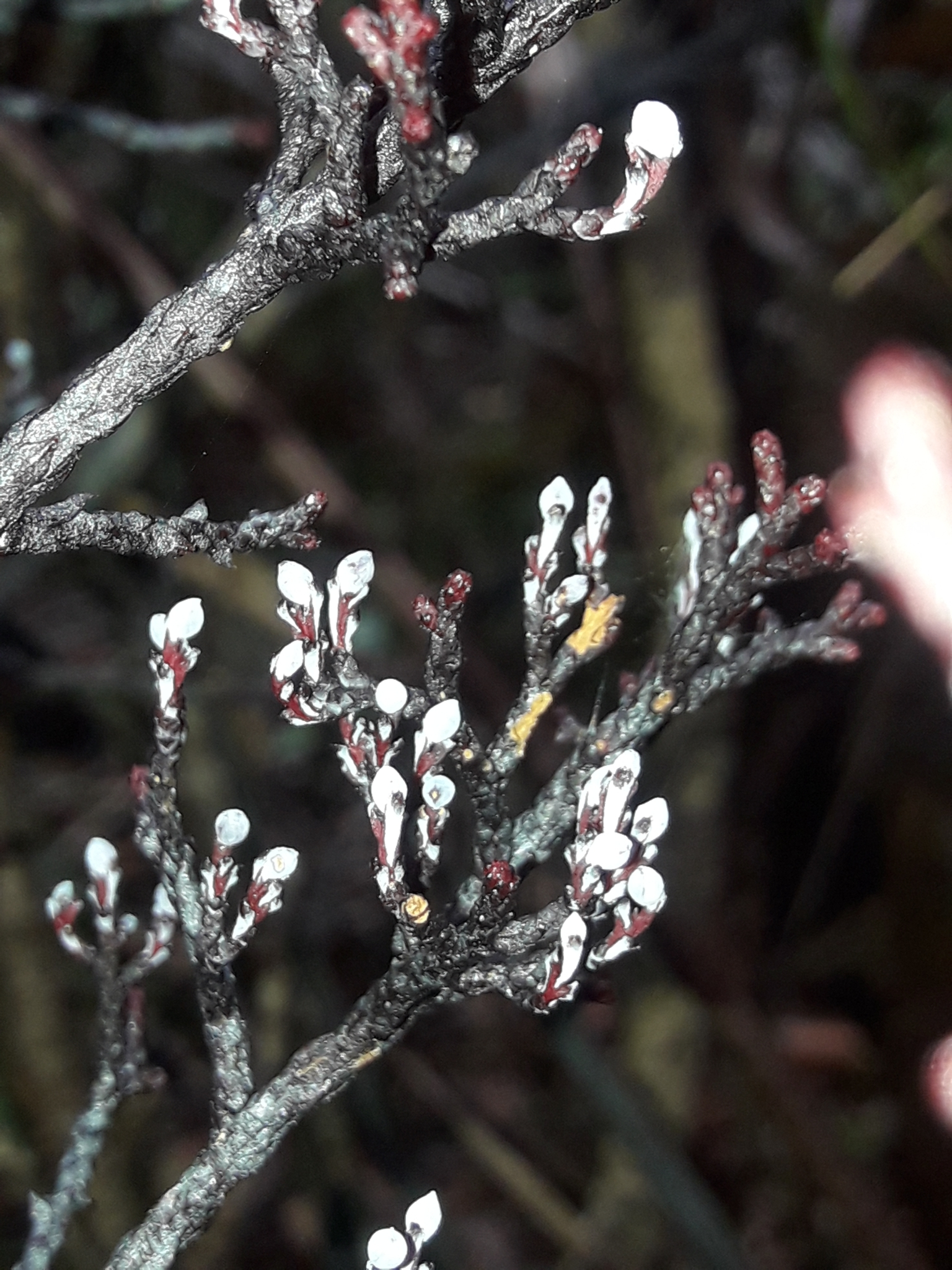
Glaucous white seed cones.

Usta means 'parched'. The species was first described as Dacrydium ustum Vieill.; other synonyms include Podocarpus ustus (Vieill.) Brongn. & Gris, and Nageia usta (Vieill.) Kuntze. The name is often cited as Parasitaxus ustus, but this is grammatically incorrect, as, according to Latin, the genus name Parasitaxus is (like Taxus) gender-feminine, with which the species name's gender must agree (Nickrent 2006). The scientific name translates as "parched parasitic yew."

== Ecology ==
It is generally mentioned that Parasitaxus usta is the only known parasitic gymnosperm. The species lacks roots and is always found attached to roots identified as of Falcatifolium taxoides (another member of the Podocarpaceae). The first study of the union of P. usta with a host showed anatomical changes typical of a parasite. However, the question is still left open, as the plant is in any case not a haustorial parasite, which is usually the case with angiosperms. Certain experts therefore consider the plant as a myco-heterotroph.
