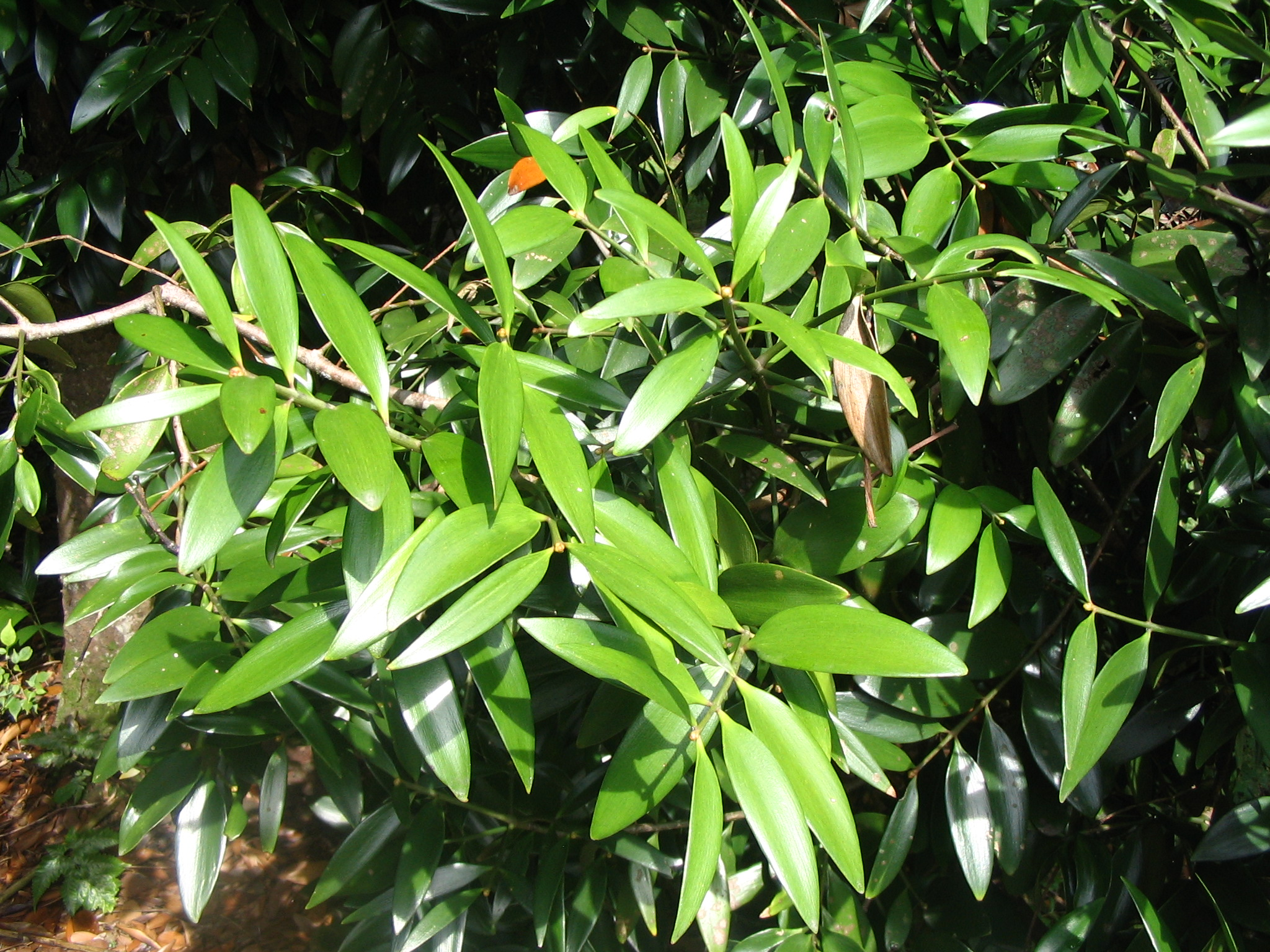

Conservation status
- Endangered (IUCN 3.1)

Scientific classification
- Kingdom: Plantae
- Clade: Tracheophytes
- Clade: Gymnospermae
- Division: Pinophyta
- Class: Pinopsida
- Order: Araucariales
- Family: Araucariaceae
- Genus: Agathis
- Species: A. borneensis

Binomial name
- Agathis borneensis Warb.

Synonyms
- Agathis beccarii Warb.; Agathis macrostachys Warb.; Agathis rhomboidalis Warb.; Agathis beckingii Meijer Drees; Agathis endertii Meijer Drees; Agathis latifolia Meijer Drees

= Agathis borneensis =

Species of conifer

Agathis borneensis, also known as Borneo kauri, is a species of conifer in the family Araucariaceae.

== Description ==
The Borneo kauri grows to a maximum height of 50 metres. It has a long narrow cone and dark green leaves. The closest relative of this species is Agathis dammara.

== Taxonomy ==
A 1998 IUCN assessment of Agathis dammara regarded Agathis borneensis as a synonym. IUCN assessor Aljos Farjon now treats A. borneensis as a distinct species. In his IUCN assessments of 1998 and 2010, Farjon assessed Agathis endertii as a separate species. However, as of 2013, he considers A. endertii synonymous with A. borneensis.

== Distribution and habitat ==
Agathis borneensis is native to Sumatra, Peninsular Malaysia and Borneo. It occurs in lowland to upland tropical rainforest up to elevations of 2,400 metres (8,000 ft).
