= Netta Elizabeth Gray =

Botanist (1913–1970)

- Born: 1913
- Died: 1970 (aged 56–57)
- Scientific career
- Fields: Botany; Podocarpus; Spermatophytes
- Author abbrev. (botany): N.E.Gray

Netta Elizabeth Gray (1913–1970) was an American botanist. She was a specialist in the conifer genus Podocarpus and much of her research material, including anatomical microscope slides, are now housed at the U.S. National Arboretum in Washington, D.C.

The standard author abbreviation N.E.Gray is used to indicate this person as the author when citing a botanical name.

== Names published ==
Incomplete list (of a total of 34 published names):

- Acmopyle sahniana J.Buchholz & N.E.Gray, J. Arnold Arbor. 28: 142 (1947)
- Podocarpus annamiensis N.E.Gray, J. Arnold Arbor. 39: 451 (1958)
- Podocarpus pallidus N.E.Gray, Bull. Bernice P. Bishop Mus. 220: 46 (1959)
- Podocarpus standleyi J.Buchholz & N.E.Gray, J. Arnold Arbor. 29: 72 (1948)

== Publications ==
Selected publications:

- Buchholz, J.T. & Gray, Netta E. (1948) A taxonomic revision of Podocarpus, I. The sections of the genus and their subdivisions with special reference to leaf anatomy. Journal of the Arnold Arboretum 29: 49–63.
- Buchholz, J.T., & Gray, Netta E. (1948) A taxonomic revision of Podocarpus, II. The American species of Podocarpus, section Stachycarpus. Journal of the Arnold Arboretum 29: 64–76.
- Gray, Netta E. (1953) A taxonomic revision of Podocarpus, VIII. The African species of section Eupodocarpus, subsections A and E. Journal of the Arnold Arboretum 34: 163–175.
- Gray, Netta E. (1958) A taxonomic revision of Podocarpus, XI. The South Pacific species of section Podocarpus, subsection B Journal of the Arnold Arboretum 39: 424–477

== Honors ==
Species named for her:

- Podocarpus grayae de Laub.
