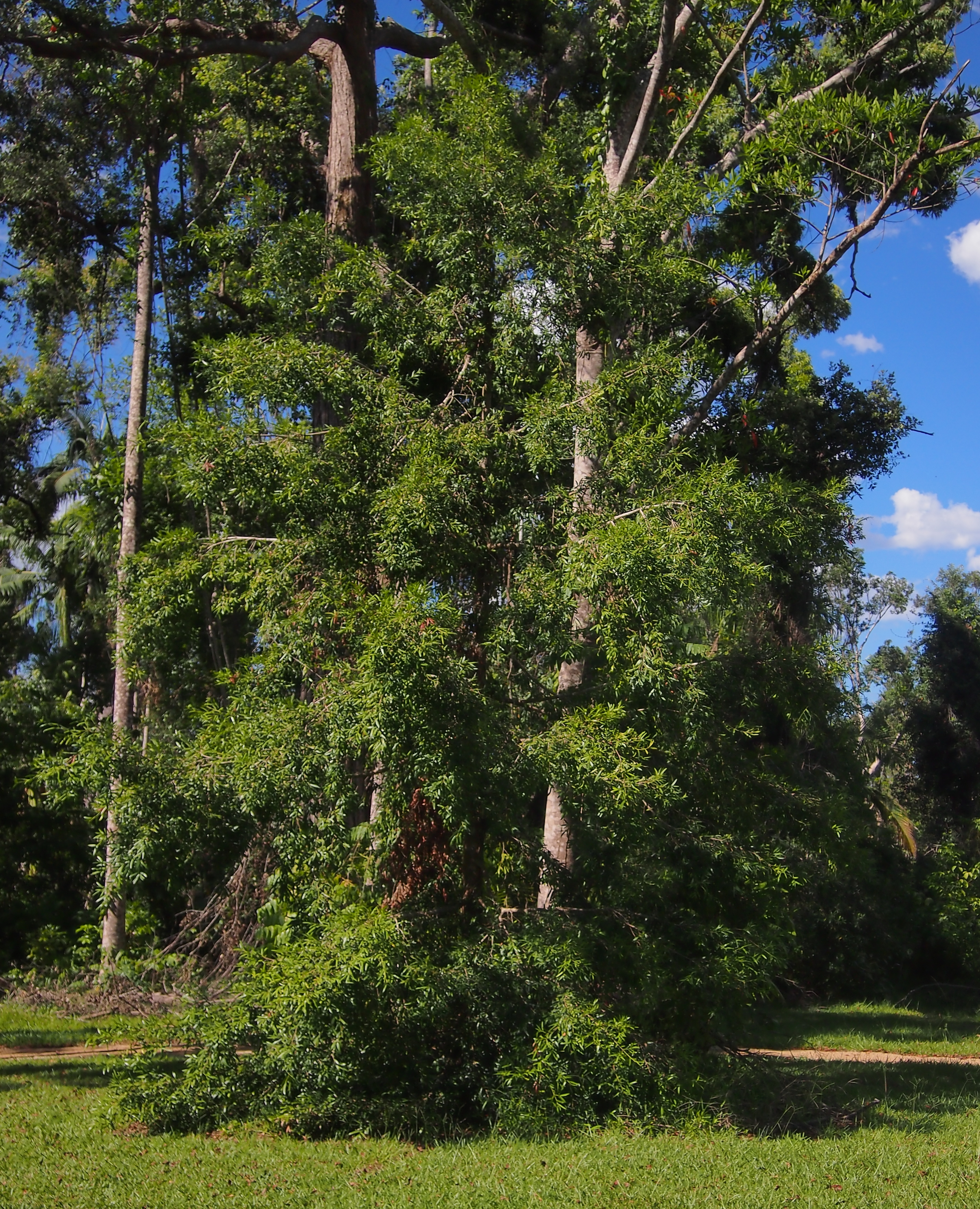
- Podocarpus elatus Illawarra Plum

Scientific classification
- Kingdom: Plantae
- Clade: Tracheophytes
- Clade: Gymnosperms
- Division: Pinophyta
- Class: Pinopsida
- Order: Araucariales
- Family: Podocarpaceae; Endl.

Genera
- See text

Synonyms
- Acmopyleaceae (Pilg.) Melikyan & A.V.Bobrov; Microcachrydaceae Doweld & Reveal; Microstrobaceae Doweld & Reveal; Nageiaceae D.Z.Fu; Phyllocladaceae Bessey; Phyllocladaceae Core ex H.Keng; Phyllolcadaceae Bessey; Prumnopityaceae A.V.Bobrov & Melikyan; Saxegothaeaceae Gaussen ex Doweld & Reveal

= Podocarpaceae =

Podocarpaceae Temporal range: Middle Jurassic–present

Podocarp family of conifers

Podocarpaceae is a large family of mainly southern hemisphere conifers, known in English as podocarps, comprising about 201 species of trees and shrubs. It contains 20 genera if Phyllocladus is included and Manoao and Sundacarpus are accepted. The family achieved its maximum diversity in the Cenozoic, making it one of the most diverse in the southern hemisphere.

The family is a classic member of the Antarctic flora, with its main centres of diversity in Australasia, particularly New Caledonia, Tasmania, and New Zealand, and to a slightly lesser extent Malesia and South America (primarily in the Andes Mountains). Several genera extend north of the equator into Indochina and the Philippines. Podocarpus reaches as far north as southern Japan and southern China in Asia, and Mexico in the Americas, and Nageia into southern China and southern India. Two genera also occur in sub-Saharan Africa, the widespread Podocarpus and the endemic Afrocarpus.

Parasitaxus usta is unique as the only known parasitic gymnosperm. It occurs on New Caledonia, where it is parasitic on another member of the Podocarpaceae, Falcatifolium taxoides.

Except for the two genera Pherosphaera and Saxegothaea, all members of Podocarpaceae have fleshy seed cones, which appears to be an ancestral trait.

The genus Phyllocladus is sister to the Podocarpaceae sensu stricto. It is treated by some botanists in its own family, the Phyllocladaceae.

== Taxonomy ==
The Podocarpaceae show great diversity, both morphologically and ecologically. Members occur mainly in the Southern Hemisphere, with most genetic variety taking place in New Caledonia, New Zealand, and Tasmania. Species diversity of Podocarpus is found mainly in South America and the Indonesian islands, the latter also being rich in Dacrydium and Dacrycarpus species.

Podocarpus (with 82 to 100 species) and Dacrydium (with 21 species) are the largest genera. A few genera are common to New Zealand and South America, supporting the view that podocarps had an extensive distribution over southern Gondwanaland. The breaking up of Gondwanaland led to large-scale speciation of the Podocarpaceae.

Until 1970, only seven Podocarpaceae genera were accepted: Podocarpus, Dacrydium, Phyllocladus, Acmopyle, Microcachrys, Saxegothaea, and Pherosphaera. All four of the African species fell under Podocarpus – P. falcatus, P. elongatus, P. henkelii, and P. latifolius. Taxonomists divided Podocarpus species into eight species groups based on leaf anatomy: Afrocarpus J.Buchholz & N.E.Gray, Dacrycarpus Endl., Eupodocarpus Endl., Microcarpus Pilg., Nageia (Gaertn.) Endl., Polypodiopsis C.E.Bertrand (non Polypodiopsis Carriére nom. rej. prop. 6), Stachycarpus Endl. and Sundacarpus J.Buchholz and N.E.Gray.

Studies of embryology, gametophyte development, female cone structure, and cytology led to the belief that the eight categories probably deserved generic status. Researchers agreed on the need to recognize "fairly natural groupings which prove to have good geographic and probably evolutionary cohesion" and took the necessary steps to raise each section to generic status.

In 1990, a treatment of the Podocarpaceae accepted 17 genera, excluding Phyllocladus from the family, while recognizing Sundacarpus, but not Manoao. In 1995, Manoao was segregated from Lagarostrobus, based on morphological characteristics. In 2002, a molecular phylogenetic study showed Sundacarpus is embedded in Prumnopitys and the monophyly of Lagarostrobos is doubtful if Manoao is included within it. More recent treatments of the family have accepted both Manoao and Sundacarpus, resolving the monophyly of Prumnopitys with respect to Sundacarpus by splitting some species out into a new genus Pectinopitys.

== Evolution ==
Molecular evidence supports Podocarpaceae being the sister group to the Araucariaceae, and having diverged from it during the late Permian. While some fossils attributed to the family have been reported from the Late Permian and Triassic, like Rissikia, these cannot be unambiguously assigned to the family. The oldest unambiguous members of the family are known from the Jurassic period, found across both hemispheres, such as Scarburgia and Harrisiocarpus from the Middle Jurassic of England, as well as unnamed species from the Middle-Late Jurassic of Patagonia. Modern genera of the family first appeared during the Early Cretaceous, with the family probably reaching an apex of diversity during the early Cenozoic.

== Genera ==
Studies based on anatomical, biogeographical, morphological, and DNA evidence suggest these relationships:

Knopf 2012

- Podocarpaceae
  - Saxegothaea
  - - - Halocarpus
      - - Lepidothamnus
        - - Lagarostrobos
          - Manoao
        - Phyllocladus
      - Prumnopitys
    - - - Microcachrys
        - Pherosphaera
      - - Acmopyle
        - - - Dacrycarpus
            - - Falcatifolium
              - Dacrydium
          - - - Retrophyllum
              - - Nageia
                - Afrocarpus
            - Podocarpus

Leslie et al. 2018

- - Phyllocladoideae
    - Phyllocladeae
      - Lepidothamnus
      - Phyllocladus
    - Prumnopityeae
      - Halocarpus
      - - - Parasitaxus
          - - Lagarostrobos
            - Manoao
        - - Pectinopitys
          - - Sundacarpus
            - Prumnopitys
  - Podocarpoideae
    - Saxegothaeeae
      Saxegothaea
    - - Microcachrydeae
        Microcachrys
      - - Pherosphaereae
          Pherosphaera
        - - Acmopyleae
            Acmopyle
          - - Dacrydieae
              - Dacrycarpus
              - - Falcatifolium
                - Dacrydium
            - Podocarpeae
              - - Retrophyllum
                - - Afrocarpus
                  - Nageia
              - Podocarpus

=== List of extant genera ===
- Acmopyle
- Afrocarpus
- Dacrycarpus
- Dacrydium
- Falcatifolium
- Halocarpus
- Lagarostrobos
- Lepidothamnus
- Manoao
- Microcachrys
- Nageia
- Parasitaxus
- Pectinopitys
- Pherosphaera (syn. Microstrobos)
- Phyllocladus
- Podocarpus
- Prumnopitys
- Retrophyllum
- Saxegothaea
- Sundacarpus

== Extinct genera ==
Genera that have been moved into a new subfamily are tagged with ±. Genera that are woody are tagged with #.

- †Podocarpoxylon ± #
- †Protophyllocladoxylon #
- †Dacrycarpites
- †Dacrydiumites
- †Lygistepollenites?
- †Gamerroites? Moved to Coniferae incertae sedis
- †Conites?
- †Microcachryidites
- †Microcachryoxylon #
- †Phyllocladidites
- †Podocarpidites
- †Podosporites
- †Metapodocarpoxylon #
- †Protopodocarpoxylon #
- †Phyllocladoxylon ± #
- †Rissikia
- †Scarburgia
- †Harrisiocarpus
