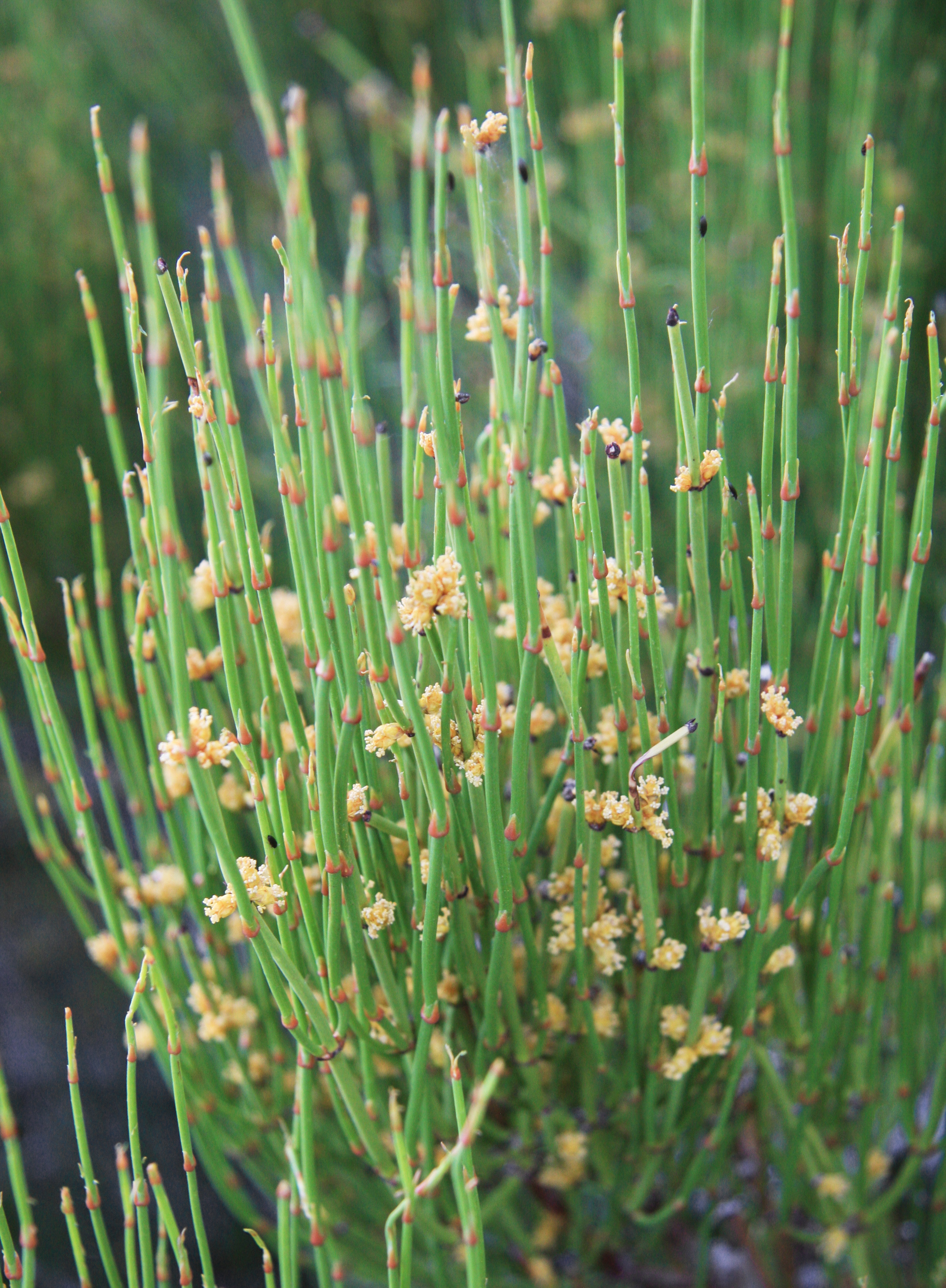
- E. viridis Coville

Scientific classification
- Kingdom: Plantae
- Clade: Tracheophytes
- Clade: Gymnosperms
- Division: Pinophyta
- Class: Pinopsida
- Subclass: Gnetidae
- Order: Ephedrales
- Family: Ephedraceae
- Genus: Ephedra; L.

Type species
- E. distachya L.
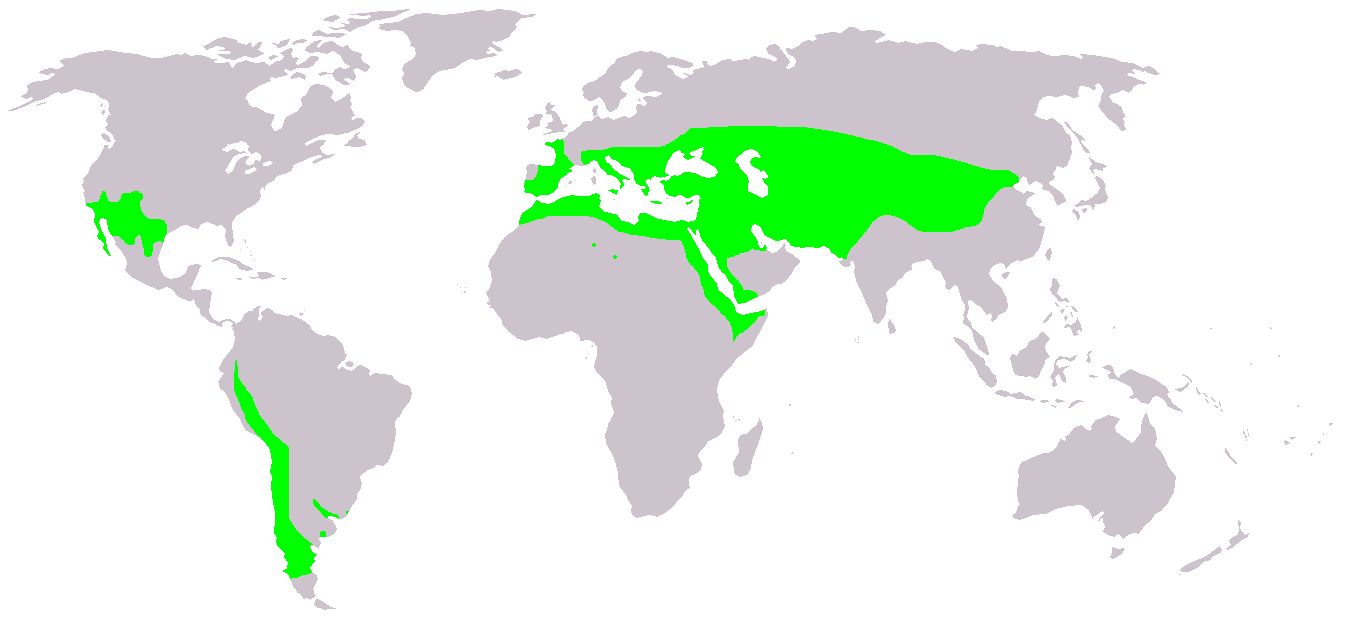
- Range of genus Ephedra

Synonyms
- 1 synonym: Chaetocladus J.Nelson (1866)

= Ephedra (plant) =

Ephedra Temporal range: Aptian–Recent

Genus of gymnosperms in the family Ephedraceae

Ephedra is a genus of gymnosperm shrubs. As of July 2025, 74 species, and two hybrids, are accepted. The species of Ephedra are widespread in many arid regions of the world, ranging across southwestern North America, southern Europe, northern Africa, southwest and central Asia, northern China, and western South America. It is the only extant genus in its family, Ephedraceae, and order, Ephedrales, and one of the three extant genera of the division Gnetophyta together with Gnetum and Welwitschia.

In temperate climates, most Ephedra species grow on shores or in sandy soils with direct sun exposure. Common names in English include joint-pine, jointfir, Mormon-tea, or Brigham tea. The Chinese name for Ephedra species is mahuang (simplified Chinese: 麻黄; traditional Chinese: 麻黃; pinyin: máhuáng; Wade–Giles: ma-huang; lit. 'hemp yellow'). Ephedra is the origin of the name of the stimulant ephedrine, which the plants contain in significant concentration.

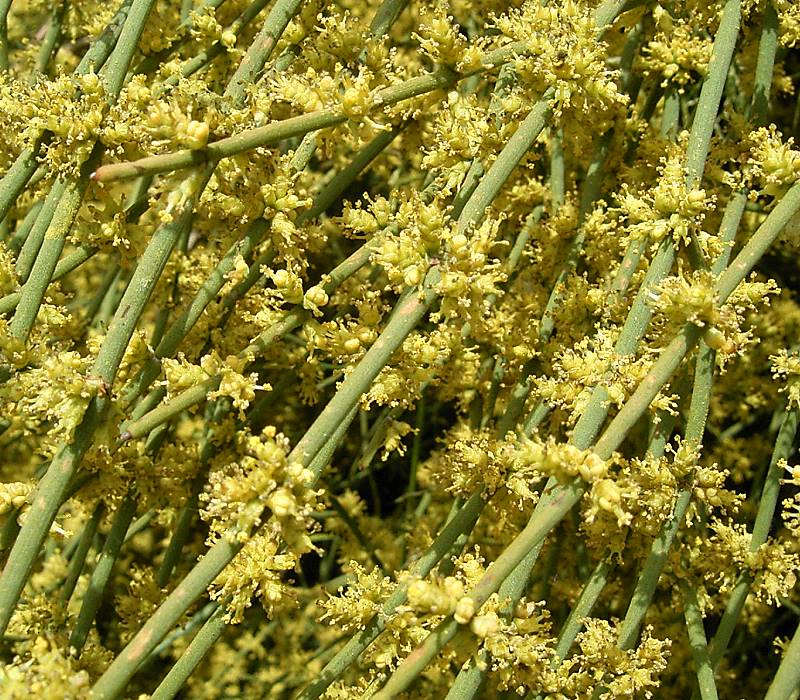
E. fragilis Desf. male cones

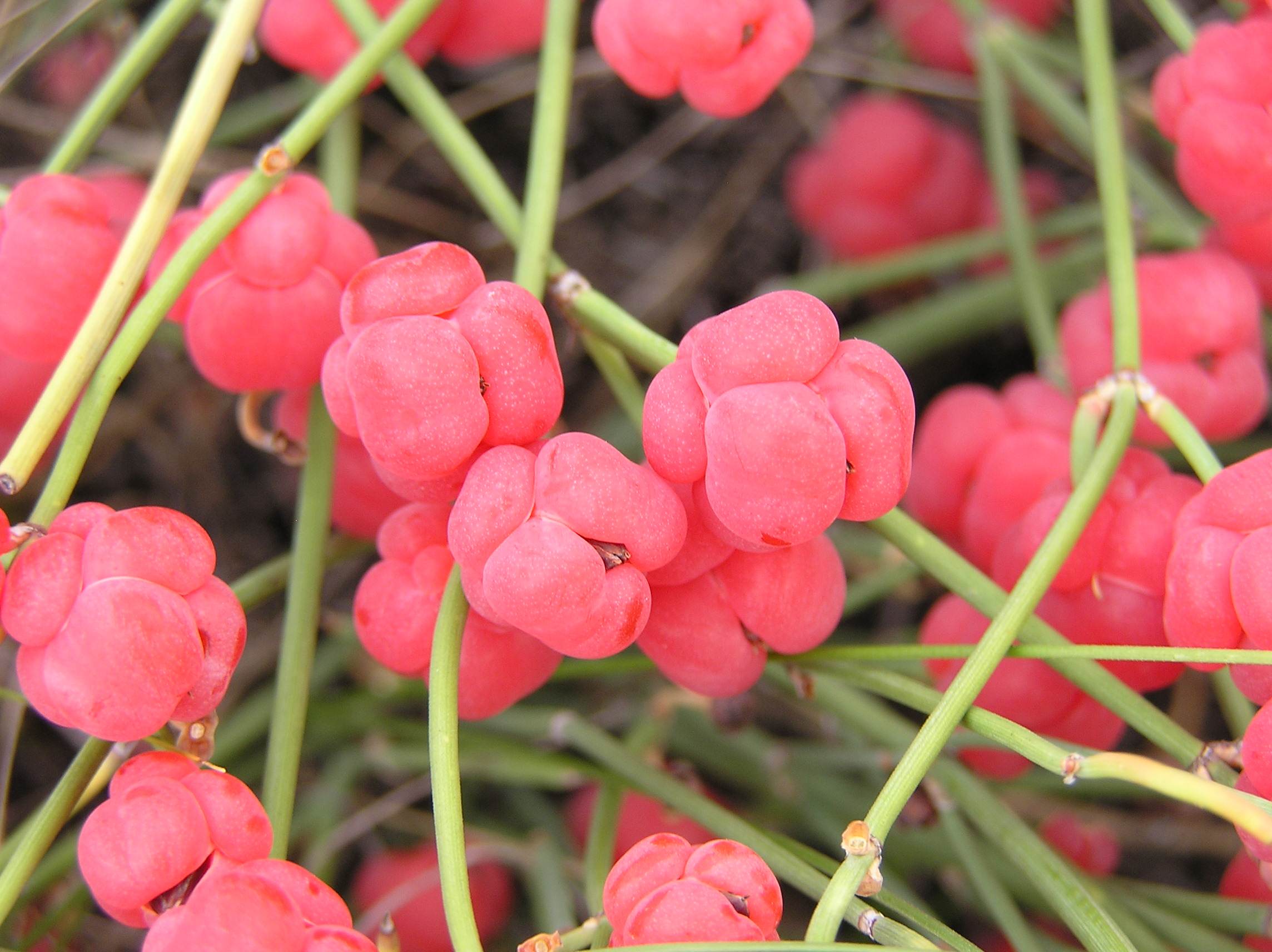
E. distachya L. female cones with seeds

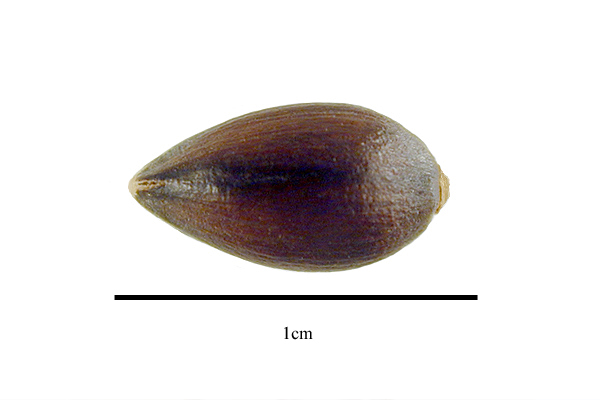
E. ciliata Fisch. & C.A.Mey. seed

== Description ==
The family Ephedraceae, of which Ephedra is the only extant genus, are gymnosperms, and generally shrubs, sometimes clambering vines, and rarely, small trees. Members of the genus frequently spread by the use of rhizomes.

The stems are green and photosynthetic. The leaves are opposite or whorled. The typical scalelike leaves are fused into a sheath at the base and is often shed soon after development. There are no resin canals. Most species have rudimentary leaves without chlorophyll or photosynthesis, but a few, like E. altissima, develop normal, slender leaf-like leaves up to 5 cm (2.0 in) long and 0.5–1 mm (0.020–0.039 in) also as adults.

The plants are mostly dioecious, with the pollen strobili in whorls of 1–10, each consisting of a series of decussate bracts. The pollen is furrowed. The female strobili also occur in whorls, with bracts which fuse around a single ovule. Fleshy bracts are white (such as in E. frustillata) or red. There are generally 1–2 yellow to dark brown seeds per strobilus.

== Taxonomy ==
The genus Ephedra was first described in 1753 by Carl Linnaeus. The type species is E. distachya L.. The family, Ephedraceae, was first described in 1829 by Barthélemy Charles Joseph Dumortier.

=== Evolutionary history ===
The oldest known members of the genus are from the Early Cretaceous around 125 million years ago, with records being known from the Aptian-Albian of Argentina, China, Portugal and the United States. The fossil record of Ephedra outside of pollen disappears after the Early Cretaceous. Molecular clock estimates have suggested that last common ancestor of living Ephedra species lived much more recently, during the Early Oligocene around 30 million years ago. However, pollen modified from the ancestral condition of the genus with branched pseudosulci (grooves), which evolved in parallel in the living North American and Asian lineages is known from the Late Cretaceous, suggesting that the last common ancestor is at least this old.

=== Species ===
Phylogeny of Ephedra

- - E. ochreata
  - - section Asarca
      - - E. pedunculata
        - E. rupestris
      - - E. nevadensis
        - - E. californica
          - - - E. antisyphilitica
              - E. frustillata
            - - E. torreyana
              - - E. aspera
                - E. trifurca
    - section Ephedra
      - E. breana
      - - E. boelckei
        - - E. milleri
          - - E. chilensis
            - - - E. triandra
                - E. tweedieana
              - - E. andina
                - - - E. sinica
                    - - E. regeliana
                      - - E. rituensis
                        - - E. monosperma
                          - - E. lomatolepis
                            - E. sarcocarpa
                  - - E. major
                    - - E. strobilacea
                      - - E. somalensis
                        - - - subsection Pachycladae
                              E. pachyclada
                          - - - subsection Scandentes
                                - - E. foeminea
                                  - - E. campylopoda
                                    - E. fragilis
                                - - E. foliata
                                  - - E. ciliata
                                    - - E. alata
                                      - - E. aphylla
                                        - E. altissima
                            - - - subsection Minutae
                                  - E. minuta
                                  - - E. gerardiana
                                    - E. viridis
                              - - subsection Americanae
                                  - E. likiangensis
                                  - - E. americana
                                    - - E. equisetina
                                      - E. rhytidosperma
                                - subsection Ephedra
                                  - - E. intermedia
                                    - E. przewalskii
                                  - - E. distachya
                                    - E. procera

As of July 2025, Plants of the World Online accepts the following 74 species, and two hybrids:

- Ephedra alata Decne. – North Africa, Arabian Peninsula
- Ephedra altissima Desf. non-Bové (1834), non-Delile (1813), non-Buch (1828) – high-climbing jointfir – North Africa, Canary Islands
- Ephedra americana Humb. & Bonpl. ex Willd. – Bolivia, Ecuador, Peru, Argentina, Chile
- Ephedra antisyphilitica Berland ex C.A.Mey. – clapweed, erect ephedra – Texas, Oklahoma, New Mexico, Nuevo León, Coahuila, Chihuahua
- Ephedra aphylla Forssk. – eastern Mediterranean from Libya and Cyprus to the Persian Gulf
- Ephedra × arenicola H.C.Cutler – Arizona, Utah (hybrid, E. cutleri × E. torreyana)
- Ephedra aspera Engelm. ex S.Watson – boundary ephedra, pitamoreal – Texas, New Mexico, Arizona, Utah, Nevada, California, Chihuahua, Durango, Zacatecas, Sinaloa, Sonora, Baja California
- Ephedra aurantiaca Takht. & Pachom. – Caucasus, Kazakhstan, Turkmenistan
- Ephedra aurea Brullo et al.
- Ephedra boelckei F.A.Roig – Argentina
- Ephedra botschantzevii Pachom. – Kazakhstan, Tuva region of Siberia
- Ephedra breana Phil. – frutilla de campo – Peru, Bolivia, Chile, Argentina
- Ephedra brevifoliata Ghahr. – Iran
- Ephedra californica S.Watson – California ephedra, California jointfir – California, western Arizona, Baja California
- Ephedra chengiae Yang & Ferguson
- Ephedra chilensis C.Presl – pingo-pingo - Chile, Argentina
- Ephedra ciliata Fisch. & C.A.Mey. (syn. Ephedra foliata Boiss. ex C.A.Mey.) – North Africa, Middle East, India
- Ephedra compacta Rose – widespread in much of Mexico
- Ephedra coryi E.L.Reed – Cory's ephedra – Texas, New Mexico
- Ephedra cutleri Peebles – Navajo ephedra, Cutler's ephedra, Cutler Mormon-tea, Cutler's jointfir – Colorado, Utah, Arizona, New Mexico, Wyoming
- Ephedra dahurica Turcz. – Siberia, Mongolia
- Ephedra dawuensis Y.Yang – Sichuan
- Ephedra distachya L. – joint-pine, jointfir – southern Europe and central Asia from Portugal to Kazakhstan
- Ephedra × eleutherolepis V.A.Nikitin – Tajikistan (hybrid E. intermedia × E. strobilacea)
- Ephedra equisetina Bunge – ma huang – Caucasus, Central Asia, Siberia, Mongolia, Gansu, Hebei, Inner Mongolia, Ningxia, Qinghai, Shanxi, Xinjiang
- Ephedra fasciculata A.Nelson – Arizona ephedra, Arizona jointfir, desert Mormon-tea – Arizona, California, Nevada, Utah
- Ephedra fedtschenkoae Paulsen – Central Asia, Siberia, Mongolia, Xinjiang
- Ephedra foeminea Forssk. – North Africa, Somalia, Balkans, Italy, Middle East; naturalized in Santa Barbara County of California
- Ephedra fragilis Desf. – joint pine – Mediterranean, Canary Islands, Madeira
- Ephedra frustillata Miers – Patagonian ephedra – Chile, Argentina
- Ephedra funerea Coville & C.V.Morton – Death Valley ephedra, Death Valley jointfir – California, Arizona, Nevada
- Ephedra gerardiana Wall. ex Klotzsch & Garcke – Gerard's jointfir, shan ling ma huang – Himalayas, Tibet, Yunnan, Siberia, Central Asia
- Ephedra glauca Regel – Iran east to Mongolia and northern China
- Ephedra gracilis Phil. ex Stapf
- Ephedra holoptera Riedl – Iran
- Ephedra intermedia Schrenk & C.A.Mey. – zhong ma huang – China, Siberia, Central Asia, Himalayas, Iran, Pakistan
- Ephedra kardangensis P.Sharma & P.L.Uniyal – western Himalayas
- Ephedra karumanchiana S.K.Patel, S.M.Patil, Raole & K.S.Rajput – Northwest India
- Ephedra laristanica Assadi – Iran
- Ephedra likiangensis Florin – Guizhou, Sichuan, Tibet, Yunnan
- Ephedra lomatolepis Schrenk – Kazakhstan, Tuva region of Siberia
- Ephedra milleri Freitag & Maier-St. – Oman, Yemen
- Ephedra minuta Florin – Qinghai, Sichuan
- Ephedra monosperma J.G.Gmel. ex C.A.Mey. – dan zi ma huang – Siberia, Mongolia, much of China including Tibet and Xinjiang
- Ephedra multiflora Phil. ex Stapf – Chile, Argentina
- Ephedra nebrodensis Tineo - Mediterranean region except northeast Africa
- Ephedra nevadensis S.Watson – Nevada ephedra, Nevada jointfir, Nevada Mormon-tea – Baja California, California, Arizona, Nevada, Utah, Oregon
- Ephedra nutans Miau & Xiao L.Pan – Xinjiang
- Ephedra ochreata Miers – Argentina
- Ephedra oxyphylla Riedl – Afghanistan
- Ephedra pachyclada Boiss. – Middle East from Sinai and Yemen to Pakistan
- Ephedra pedunculata Engelm. ex S.Watson – vine ephedra, vine jointfir – Texas, Chihuahua, Coahuila, Durango, San Luis Potosí, Nuevo León, Zacatecas
- Ephedra pentandra Pachom. – Iran
- Ephedra procera Fisch. & C.A.Mey. − Iran, Caucasus
- Ephedra przewalskii Stapf – Central Asia, Mongolia, Pakistan, Gansu, Inner Mongolia, Ningxia, Qinghai, Tibet
- Ephedra pseudodistachya Pachom. – Siberia, Mongolia
- Ephedra regeliana Florin – xi zi ma huang – Central Asia, Siberia, Pakistan, Xinjiang
- Ephedra rhytidosperma Pachom., syn. E. lepidosperma C.Y.Cheng – Gansu, Inner Mongolia, Ningxia, Mongolia
- Ephedra rituensis Y.Yang, D.Z.Fu & G.H.Zhu – Qinghai, Xinjiang, Tibet
- Ephedra rupestris Benth. – Ecuador, Peru, Bolivia, Argentina
- Ephedra sarcocarpa Aitch. & Hemsl. – Pakistan, Afghanistan
- Ephedra saxatilis (Stapf) Royle ex Florin
- Ephedra sinica Stapf – cao ma huang, Chinese ephedra – Mongolia, Siberia, Primorye, Manchuria
- Ephedra somalensis Freitag & Maier-St. – Somalia, Eritrea
- Ephedra stipitata Biswas & Rita Singh
- Ephedra strobilacea Bunge – Iran, Central Asia
- Ephedra strongylensis Brullo et al.
- Ephedra tilhoana Maire – Chad
- Ephedra torreyana S.Watson – Torrey's ephedra, Torrey's jointfir, Torrey's Mormon-tea, cañutillo – Nevada, Utah, Colorado, Arizona, New Mexico, Texas, Chihuahua
- Ephedra transitoria Riedl – Iraq, Syria, Palestine, Saudi Arabia
- Ephedra triandra Tul. − Bolivia, Argentina
- Ephedra trifurca Torrey ex S.Watson – longleaf ephedra, longleaf jointfir, longleaf Mormon-tea, popotilla, teposote – California, Arizona, New Mexico, Texas, Chihuahua, Sonora, Baja California
- Ephedra trifurcata Zöllner
- Ephedra tweedieana C.A.Mey. – Brazil, Argentina, Uruguay
- Ephedra viridis Coville – green ephedra, green Mormon-tea – California, Nevada, Utah, Arizona, New Mexico, Colorado, Wyoming, South Dakota, Oregon
- Ephedra vvedenskyi Pachom. – Iran, Caucasus, Turkmenistan

== Distribution ==
The genus is found in dry and desert regions worldwide, except for Australia.

== Ecology ==
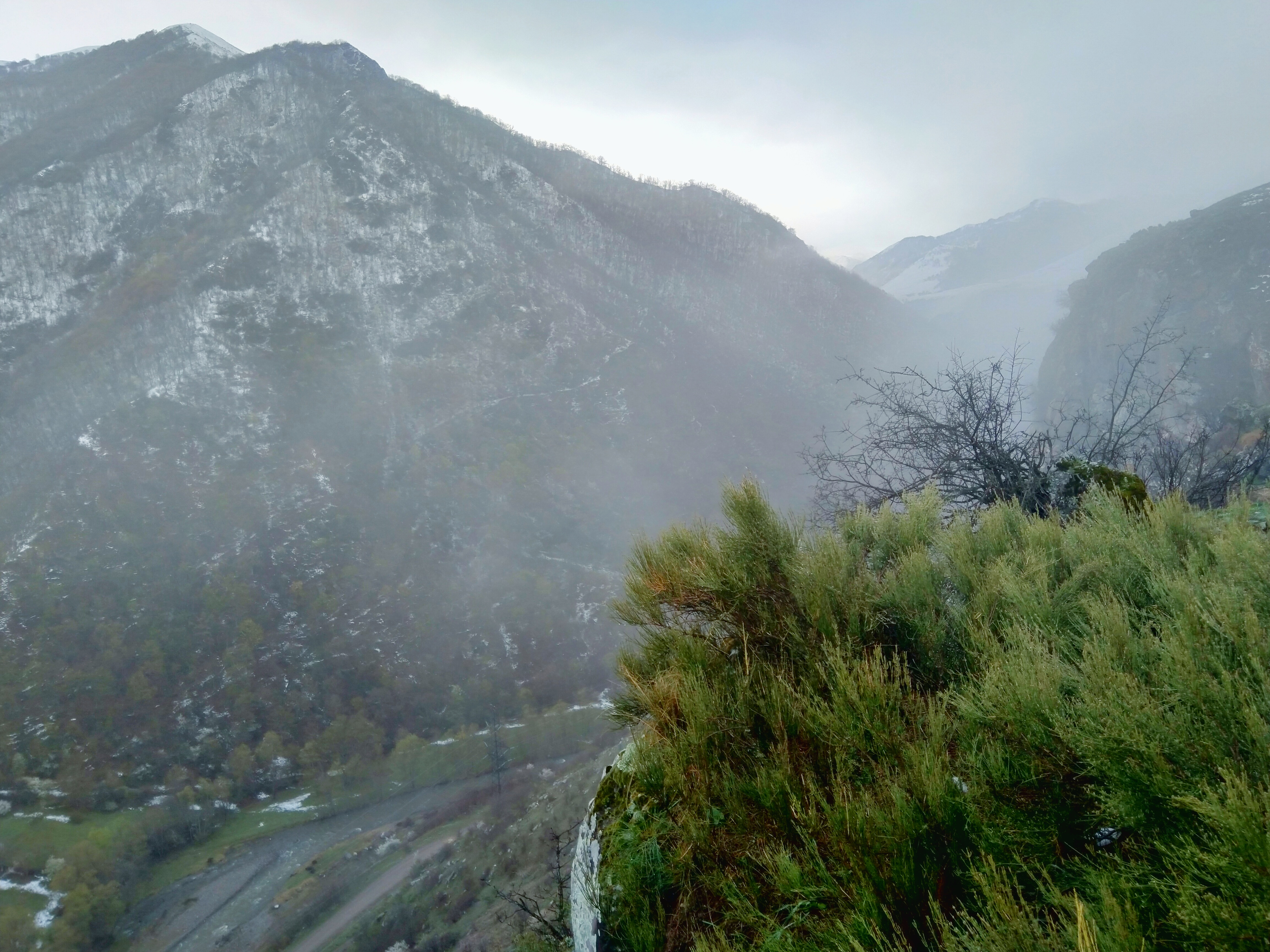
E. foeminea Forssk. shrub in Kalbajar

Ephedraceae are adapted to extremely arid regions, growing often in high sunny habitats, and occur as high as 4,000 m (13,000 ft) above sea level in both the Andes and the Himalayas. They make up a significant part of the North American Great Basin sage brush ecosystem.

Today, Ephedra plants are found no further south than 3°N in the Saharo-Arabian region. However, researchers have discovered evidence of this drought-resistant plant living over 1,000 km (620 mi) further south at Oldupai Gorge around one million years ago, based on fossil pollen, preserved tap roots, and supporting indicators of arid conditions.

== Human use ==
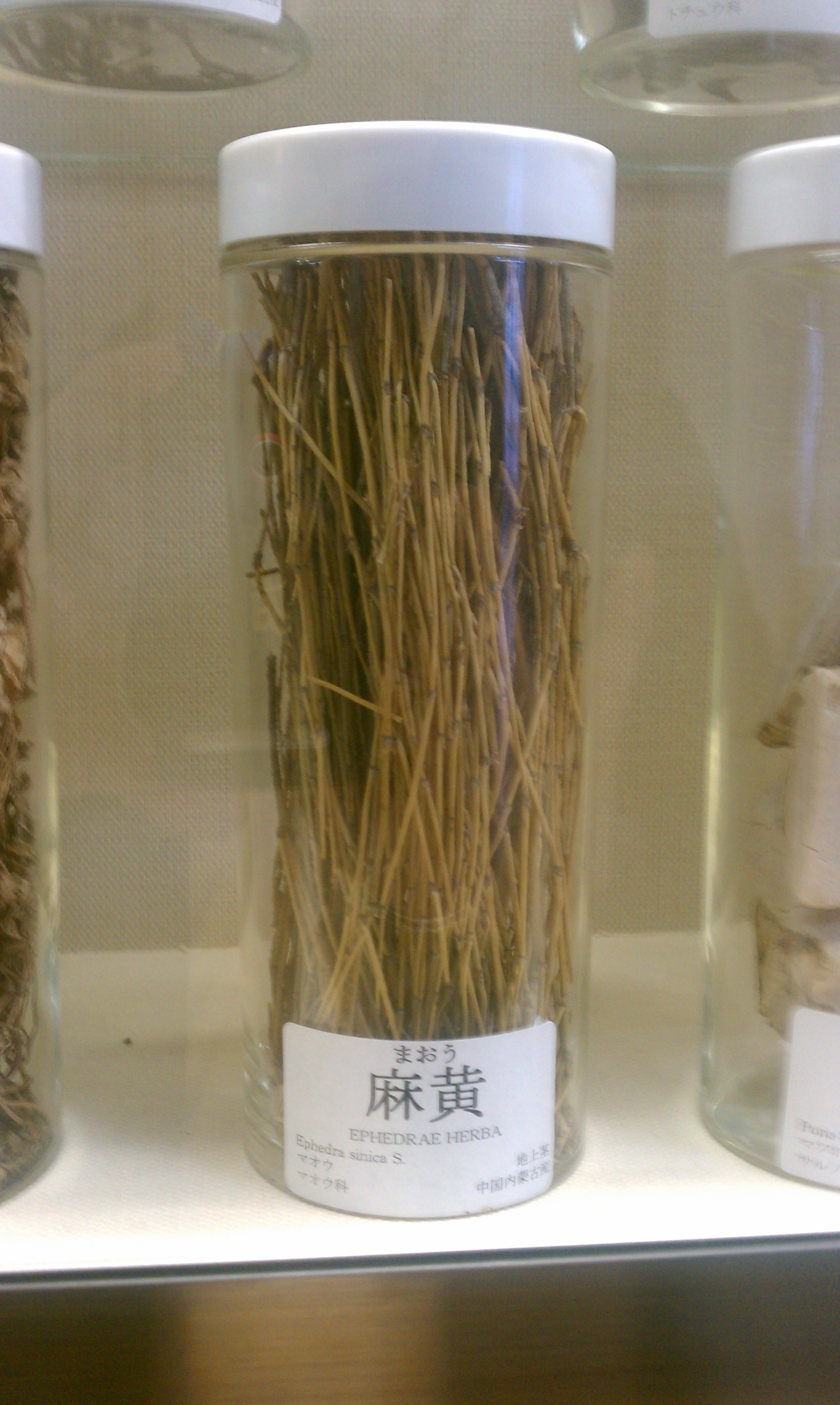
Plant as used in Chinese herbology (crude medicine)

Remains of a buried Neanderthal found at Shanidar cave in Iraqi Kurdistan, over 50,000 years old was found associated with Ephedra pollen among those of other plants. While some authors have suggested that these represent plant remains deliberately buried alongside the Neanderthal, other authors have suggested that natural agents like bees may have been responsible for the accumulation of pollen.

In addition, archaeological remains of Ephedra dating back 15,000 years have been discovered at Taforalt Cave in Morocco. Fossil cones of Ephedra were found concentrated in the cemetery area, specifically within a human burial. According to Zoroastrian belief, the species Ephedra procera is identified as haoma, and the plant and its extract are considered divine.

The Ephedra alkaloids, ephedrine and pseudoephedrine — constituents of E. sinica and other members of the genus — have sympathomimetic and decongestant qualities, and have been used as dietary supplements, mainly for weight loss. The drug ephedrine is used to prevent low blood pressure during spinal anesthesia.

In the United States, ephedra supplements were banned from the market in the early twenty-first century due to serious safety risks. Plants of the genus Ephedra, including E. sinica and others, were used in traditional medicine for treating headache and respiratory infections, but there is little to no publicly available evidence that they are effective or safe for these purposes.

Ephedra has also had a role as a precursor in the clandestine manufacture of methamphetamine.

=== Adverse effects ===
Alkaloids obtained from the species of Ephedra used in herbal medicines, such as pseudoephedrine and ephedrine, can cause cardiovascular events. These events have been associated with arrhythmias, palpitations, tachycardia and myocardial infarction. Caffeine consumption in combination with ephedrine has been reported to increase the risk of these cardiovascular events.

=== Economic botany and alkaloid content ===
The earliest uses of Ephedra species (mahuang) for specific illnesses date back to 5000 BC. Ephedrine and its isomers were isolated in 1881 from E. distachya and characterized by the Japanese organic chemist Nagai Nagayoshi. His work to access Ephedra's active ingredients to isolate a pure pharmaceutical substance led to the systematic production of semi-synthetic derivatives thereof and is still relevant today. Three species, E. sinica, E. vulgaris, and to a lesser extent E. equisetina, are commercially grown in Mainland China as a source for natural ephedrines and isomers for use in pharmaceuticals. E. sinica and E. distachya usually carry six optically active phenylethylamines, mostly ephedrine and pseudoephedrine with minor amounts of norephedrine, norpseudoephedrine as well as the three methylated analogs. Reliable information on the total alkaloid content of the crude drug is difficult to obtain. Based on HPLC analyses in industrial settings, the concentrations of total alkaloids in dried Herba Ephedra ranged between 1 and 4%, and in some cases up to 6%.

For a review of the alkaloid distribution in different species of the genus Ephedra see Jian-fang Cui (1991). Other American and European species of Ephedra, e.g. E. nevadensis (Nevada Mormon tea) have not been systematically assayed; based on unpublished field investigations, they contain very low levels (less than 0.1%) or none at all.
