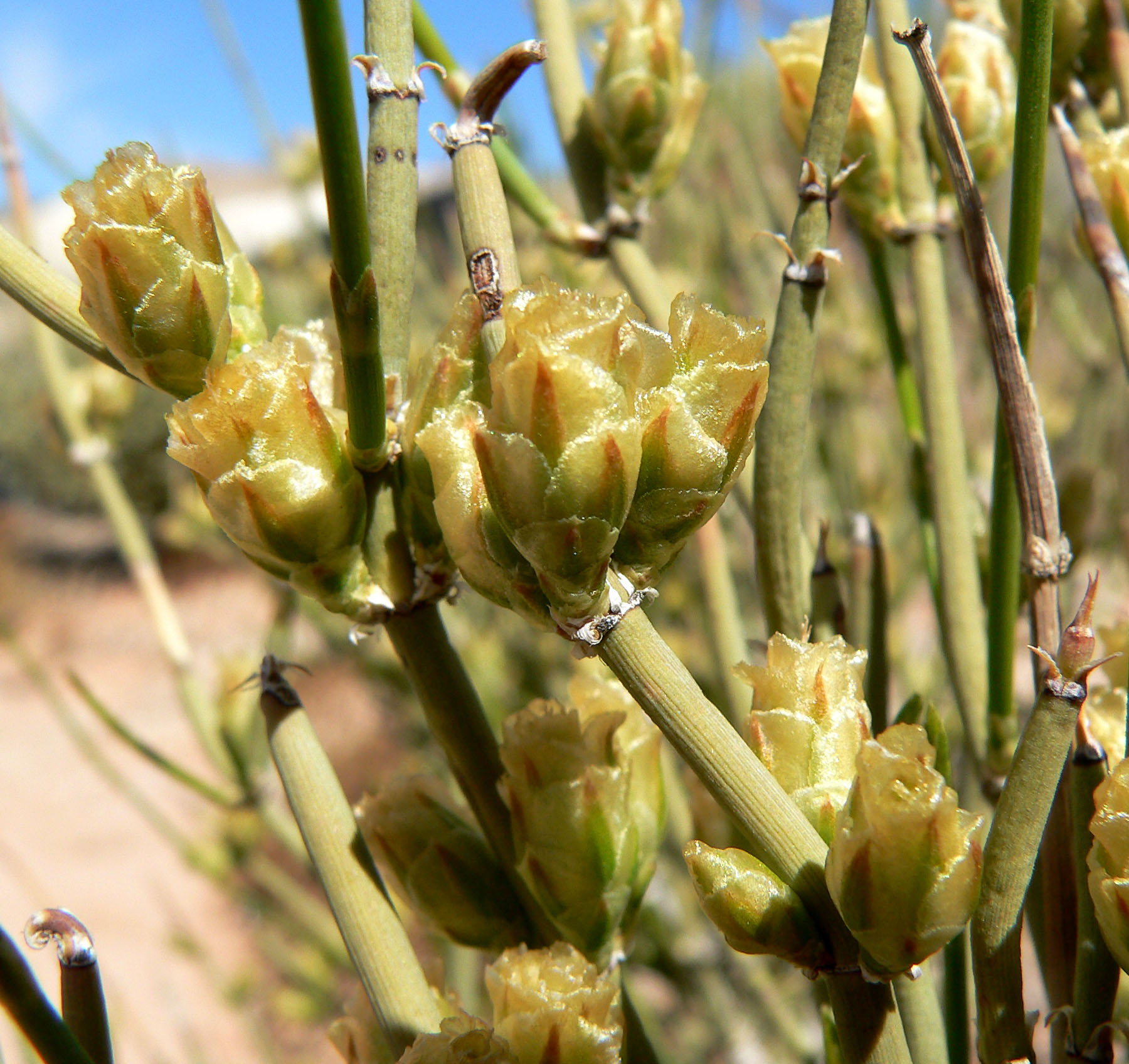

Conservation status
- Secure (NatureServe)

Scientific classification
- Kingdom: Plantae
- Clade: Tracheophytes
- Clade: Gymnospermae
- Division: Gnetophyta
- Class: Gnetopsida
- Order: Ephedrales
- Family: Ephedraceae
- Genus: Ephedra
- Species: E. torreyana

Binomial name
- Ephedra torreyana S.Watson

Varieties
- E. torreyana var. powelliorum; E. torreyana var. torreyana

= Ephedra torreyana =

Species of seed-bearing shrub

Ephedra torreyana, with common names Torrey's jointfir or Torrey's Mormon tea, is a species of Ephedra that is native to the deserts and scrublands of the Southwestern United States (Nevada, Utah, Colorado, Arizona, New Mexico, Texas) and to the State of Chihuahua and northern Mexico.

It was originally described by Sereno Watson in 1879, and placed in section Alatae, "tribe" Habrolepides by Otto Stapf in 1889. In 1996 Robert A. Price left E. torreyana in section Alatae without recognizing a tribe.

== Varieties ==
- Ephedra torreyana var. powelliorum — Texas and Chihuahua
- Ephedra torreyana var. torreyana - Southwestern United States
