= E. californica =

E. californica may refer to:

- Encelia californica, the California brittlebush, a flowering plant species native to southern California and Baja California
- Ephedra californica, the California jointfir, California ephedra, desert tea or cañatillo, a plant species native to southern California, Arizona and Baja California
- Eschscholzia californica, the California poppy, a plant species native to the western United States and in Mexico

== See also ==
- List of Latin and Greek words commonly used in systematic names#C
