= Ephedra coryi =

Conservation status
- Least Concern (IUCN 3.1)

Scientific classification
- Kingdom: Plantae
- Clade: Tracheophytes
- Clade: Gymnospermae
- Division: Gnetophyta
- Class: Gnetopsida
- Order: Ephedrales
- Family: Ephedraceae
- Genus: Ephedra
- Species: E. coryi

Binomial name
- Ephedra coryi E.L.Reed
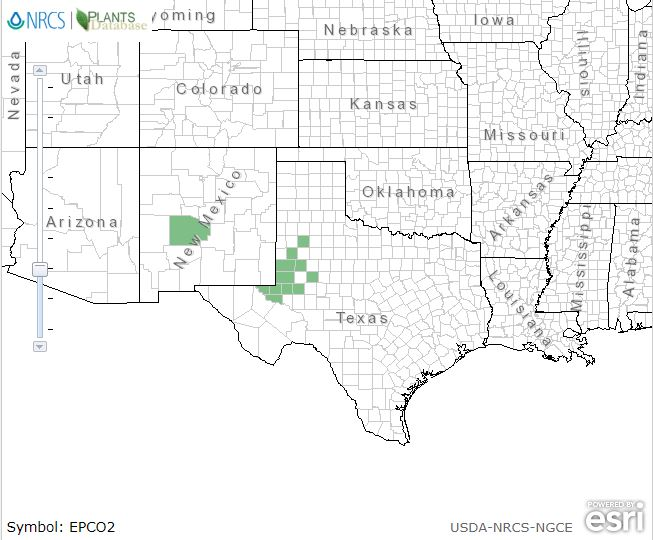
- Distribution of Ephedra coryi
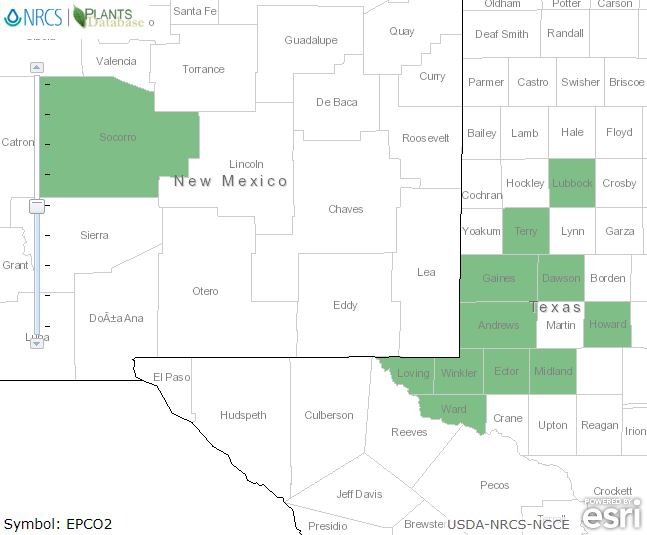
- Ephedra coryi county distribution map

Species of seed-bearing shrub

Ephedra coryi, also known as Cory's joint-fir, is a rare, reed-like gymnosperm native to sandy, semi-arid areas of the North American South and Southwest.

== Description ==
E. coryi is a Gymnosperm and a member of the Gnetophyta. E. coryi is a perennial shrub.

Plant height ranges from 1–3 ft. The man photosynthetic structures of E. coryi are the stems, as is typical of the genus. The stems are thin and green with thicker, hardened bases covered in dark brown bark. Internodes are 1–5 mm in length. As a gymnosperm, E. coryi produces cones. The female cones are about 4–6 mm long and typically appear orange or yellow when mature. The cones grow on bare peduncles 7–15 mm in length and produce two smooth brown oval-shaped seeds. Cone maturation occurs from March to April. The plant forms conic terminal buds 1–3 mm in length. Mature female cones are sometimes mistaken for flowers at a distance, as they appear in groups of several cones at stem joints.

E. coryi is similar to, and may be confused with the more common E. aspera, but E. coryi has two seeds in each cone while E. aspera only has one.

== Distribution ==
Ephedra coryi is found in the southern continental region of the United States. Native populations can be found growing in the county of Socorro, New Mexico, and several counties in Texas including; Andrews, Dawson, Ector, Gaines, Howard, Loving, Lubbock, Midland, Terry, Ward, and Winkler. This species is well-suited to arid environments and is capable of surviving in rocky, thin-soil areas including mesas.

== Ecology ==
This species is a rhizomatous shrub. It is found growing in nutrient scarce soils, such as sandy soils, rocky cliffs, dunes, semi-arid grassland prairies, and "shinneries" (dense thickets) of scrub oak.

== Conservation status ==
Cory's joint-fir is considered a rare plant due to its restricted geographic range. The IUCN Red List classifies this species as one of Least-concern because there are currently no threats facing the known populations. Their population numbers are classified as stable. While this plant is rare, it is not considered endangered by the terms of the IUCN Red List. NatureServe, a non-profit organization that assesses the conservation status of plants (amongst other things), lists the conservation status of E. coryi as G3N3, meaning it is vulnerable globally and nationally. It is listed as S3 in Texas, meaning it is considered vulnerable in that state as well. New Mexico has not listed the same vulnerable conservation status. Additionally, in a 2011 meeting, the New Mexico Rare Plant Technical Council (NMRPTC) determined that Cory's joint-fir did not meet their organization's standards for "rare" classification. For ex situ (off-site) conservation methods to be employed, a seed collection would need to be conducted. IUCN has noted that no known seed collections have been made in recent years, making it unlikely that such methods will be utilized in the near future.
