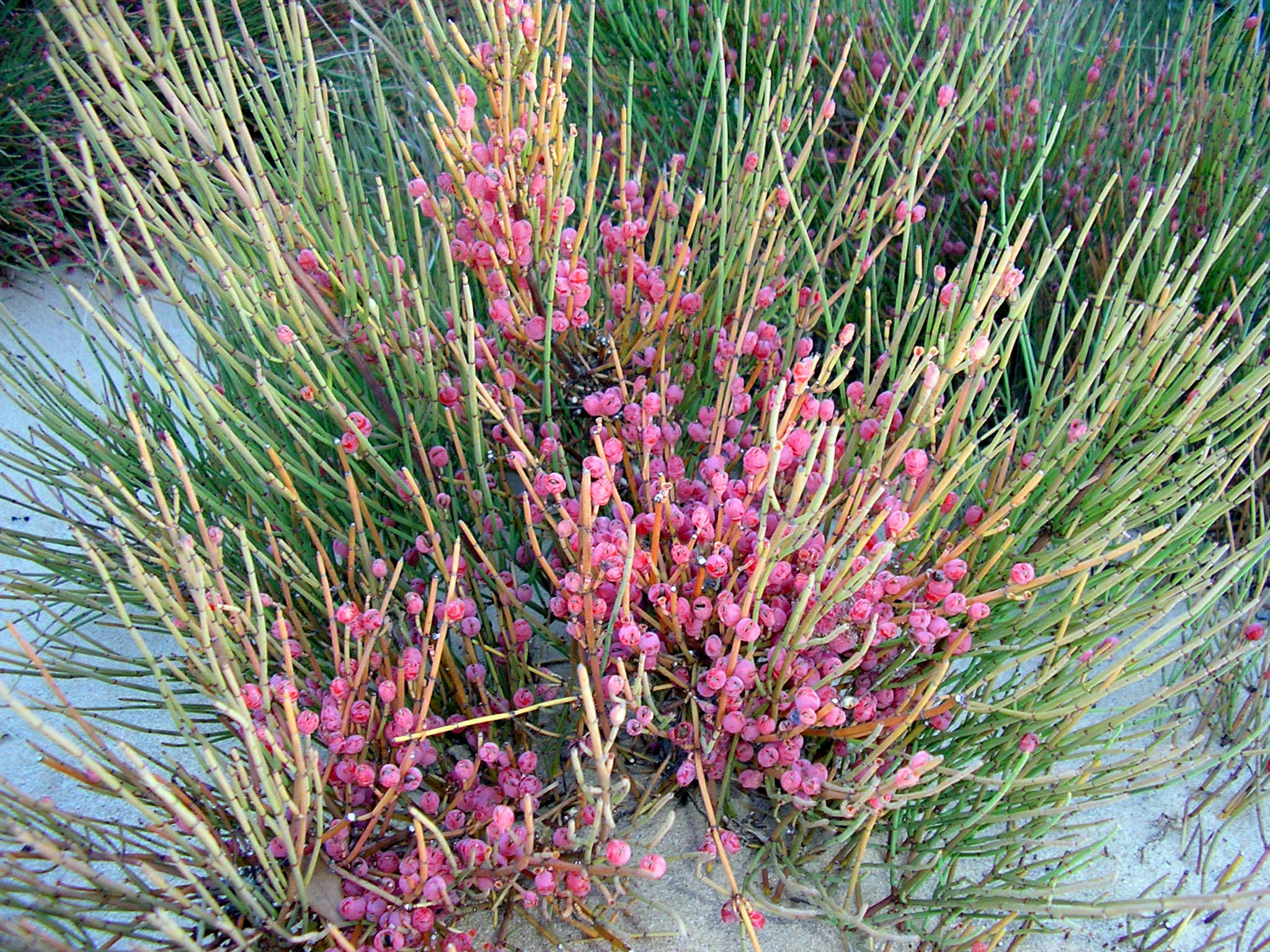
- Ephedra fragilis Algeciras, Spain

Scientific classification
- Kingdom: Plantae
- Clade: Tracheophytes
- Clade: Gymnospermae
- Division: Gnetophyta
- Class: Gnetopsida
- Order: Ephedrales
- Family: Ephedraceae
- Genus: Ephedra
- Species: E. fragilis

Binomial name
- Ephedra fragilis Desf.

Synonyms
- Ephedra dissoluta Webb & Berthel.; Ephedra fragilis subsp. dissoluta (Webb & Berthel.) Trab; Ephedra fragilis subsp. desfontainii Asch. & Graebn; Ephedra gibraltarica Boiss.; Ephedra wettsteinii Buxb.; Ephedra altissima Buch 1828, illegitimate homonym, not Desf. 1799 nor Delile 1813 nor Bové 1834

= Ephedra fragilis =

Species of seed-bearing shrub

Ephedra fragilis, commonly named the joint pine, is a species of Ephedra from the western Mediterranean region of southern Europe (Italy, Spain, and Portugal) and Northern Africa, and from Madeira and the Canary Islands in the Atlantic.

Its habitats are rocky hills and stone walls, where it grows to 2m tall.

== Taxonomy ==
The plant was originally described by René Louiche Desfontaines in 1799 and placed in section Pseudobaccatae (=sect. Ephedra sect. Ephedra), "tribe" Scandentes by Otto Stapf in 1889.

In 1996 Robert A. Price classified E. fragilis in section Ephedra without recognizing a tribe.

Subspecies

1. Ephedra fragilis subsp. cossonii (Stapf) Maire - Algeria, Morocco, Western Sahara
2. Ephedra fragilis subsp. fragilis - Spain, Portugal, Balearic Islands, Sicily, Calabria, Morocco, Western Sahara, Algeria, Tunisia, Libya, Madeira, Canary Islands

== Conservation ==
Ephedra fragilis is a Least Concern species on the IUCN Red List.
