= Ephedra holoptera =

Scientific classification
- Kingdom: Plantae
- Clade: Tracheophytes
- Clade: Gymnospermae
- Division: Gnetophyta
- Class: Gnetopsida
- Order: Ephedrales
- Family: Ephedraceae
- Genus: Ephedra
- Species: E. holoptera

Binomial name
- Ephedra holoptera Riedl

Species of seed-bearing shrub

Ephedra holoptera is a species of Ephedra that is native to Iran.

It was originally described by Harald Udo von Riedl in 1963. It has been placed in section Alatae.
