= Ephedra lomatolepis =

Scientific classification
- Kingdom: Plantae
- Clade: Tracheophytes
- Clade: Gymnospermae
- Division: Gnetophyta
- Class: Gnetopsida
- Order: Ephedrales
- Family: Ephedraceae
- Genus: Ephedra
- Species: E. lomatolepis

Binomial name
- Ephedra lomatolepis Schrenk

Synonyms
- Ephedra stenosperma Schrenk & C.A.Mey.

Species of seed-bearing shrub

Ephedra lomatolepis is a species of Ephedra that is native to Kazakhstan, Mongolia, Xinjiang in China, and Tuva in Siberia.

It was originally described by Alexander Gustav von Schrenk in 1844. Otto Stapf's worldwide monograph on the genus included this species, but Stapf did not place it in a section. Later, it was placed in section Alatae.
