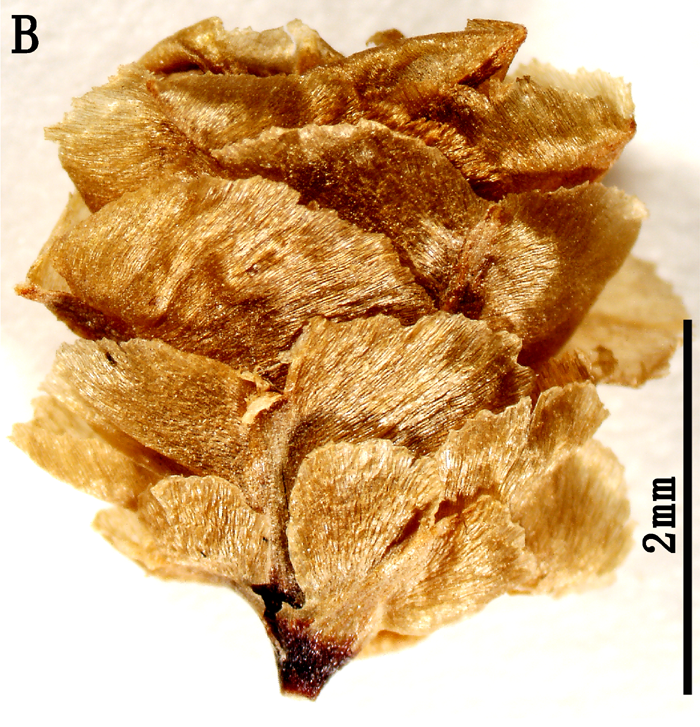
- Female cone of Ephedra strobilacea

Conservation status
- Least Concern (IUCN 3.1)

Scientific classification
- Kingdom: Plantae
- Clade: Tracheophytes
- Clade: Gymnospermae
- Division: Gnetophyta
- Class: Gnetopsida
- Order: Ephedrales
- Family: Ephedraceae
- Genus: Ephedra
- Species: E. strobilacea

Binomial name
- Ephedra strobilacea Bunge

= Ephedra strobilacea =

Species of seed-bearing shrub

Ephedra strobilacea is a species of Ephedra that is native to Iran and Central Asia (Afghanistan, Tajikistan, Turkmenistan, Uzbekistan).

The plant grows at 700–2,500 metres (2,300–8,200 ft) in elevation.

Taxonomy

It was originally described by Alexander G. von Bunge in 1852 and placed in section Alatae, tribe Tropidolepides by Otto Stapf in 1889. In 1996 Robert A. Price left E. strobilacea in section Alatae without recognizing a tribe.
