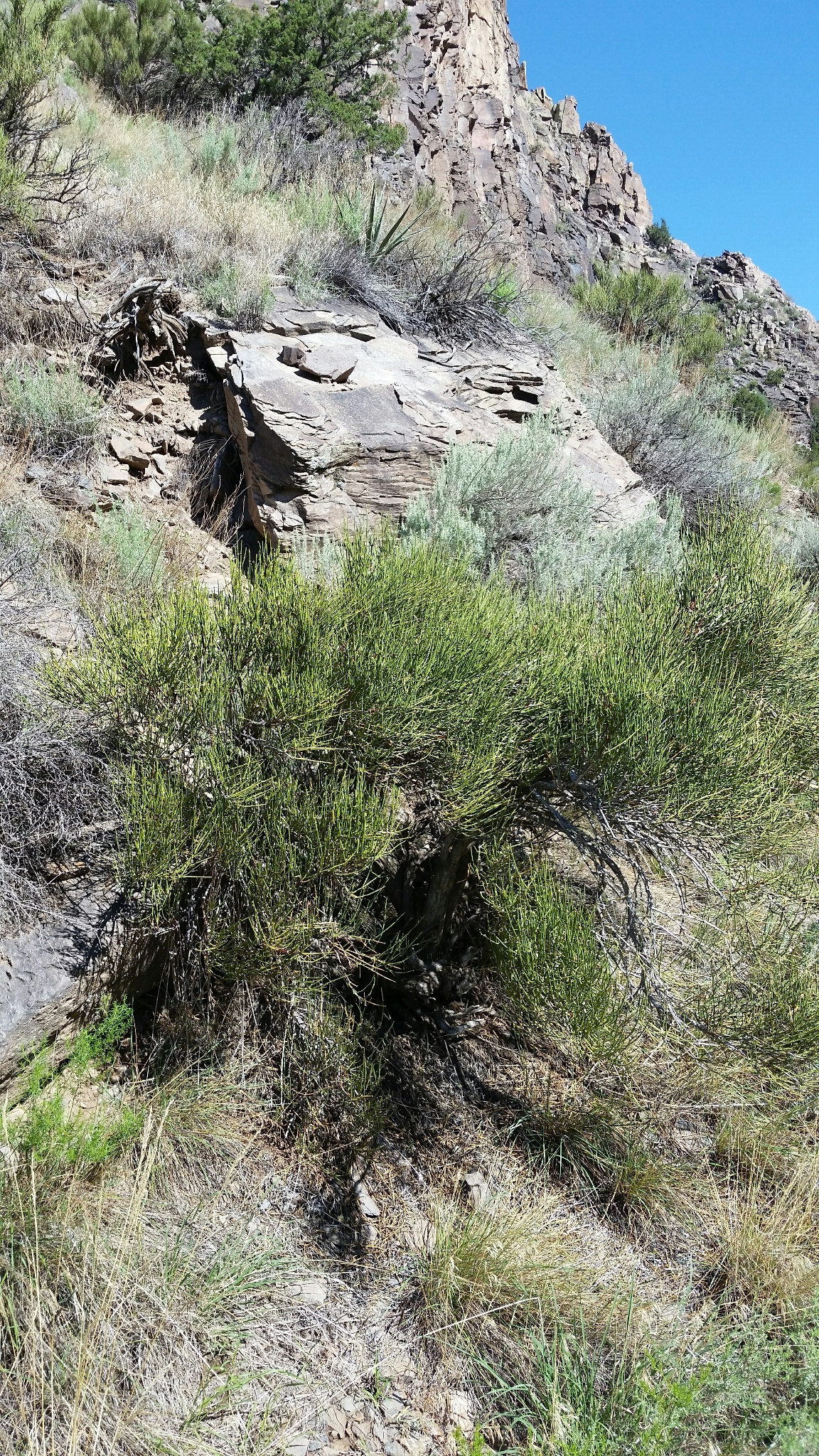

Conservation status
- Least Concern (IUCN 3.1)

Scientific classification
- Kingdom: Plantae
- Clade: Tracheophytes
- Clade: Gymnospermae
- Division: Gnetophyta
- Class: Gnetopsida
- Order: Ephedrales
- Family: Ephedraceae
- Genus: Ephedra
- Species: E. cutleri

Binomial name
- Ephedra cutleri Peebles

Synonyms
- Ephedra coryi var. viscida H.C.Cutler; Ephedra viridis var. viscida (H.C.Cutler) L.D.Benson

= Ephedra cutleri =

Species of seed-bearing shrub

Ephedra cutleri, the Navajo ephedra or Cutler's jointfir, is a species of Ephedra that is native to the Southwestern United States (Arizona, New Mexico, Utah, Colorado, Nevada, Wyoming).

== Description ==
The rhizomatous shrubs form erect clumps, .25–1.5 metres (0.82–4.92 ft) tall and 3–5 metres (9.8–16.4 ft) wide. It grows on flat and dry sandy areas, and occasionally on rocky slopes. Anchored by the rhizomes and an advantageous root system, Ephedra cutleri leaves grow in an opposite orientation but can not sustain all growth. Because the leaves are too small to perform photosynthesis, it is conducted in the sticky stems of the plant.

== Cultivation ==
In one study, E. cutleri was the major plant found in Northeastern Arizona where dry, loamy, fine sand surfaced layers of Sheppard series soils dominate and form coppice dunes due their strong rhizomes.

Stabilized dunes are preferred at higher elevations.

Evapotranspiration of waste water studies have been performed where E. cutleri is the predominant established plant species. Their adaptation to the arid conditions of the desert landscape provide ideal functionality of evaporating the deposited water.

== Uses ==
A food source for animals, there are differing views as to whether the plant has any medicinal properties for humans with the exception of brewing Mormon tea.

Native Americans in the Four Corners region have made use of the plant in various ways. The seeds were sometimes roasted and ground into flour, while the plant could also be used for making light tan or reddish dyes, as well as used in the process of tanning animal hides.

== Taxonomy ==
The plant was originally described by Robert Hibbs Peebles in 1940. It was placed in section Ephedra sect. Asarca.

The formation of the mountains and arid climatic variation conditions of the Southwestern United States and provides and ideal environment for the Ephedra species to develop. E. cutleri has diverged along with other variants such as E. californica and E. viridis during the Late Miocene and Pliocene epochs from one of the original Ephedra species E. distachya.

== Distribution ==
USA (AZ, CO, NM, UT, WY)

Dispersal method is normally small mammals.

== Wetland Indicator ==
Not determined
