= E przewalskii =

E przewalskii may refer to:

- Equus przewalskii (Przewalski's horse)
- Eolagurus przewalskii (Przewalski's steppe lemming)
- Ephedra przewalskii
