= Ephedra multiflora =

Scientific classification
- Kingdom: Plantae
- Clade: Tracheophytes
- Clade: Gymnospermae
- Division: Gnetophyta
- Class: Gnetopsida
- Order: Ephedrales
- Family: Ephedraceae
- Genus: Ephedra
- Species: E. multiflora

Binomial name
- Ephedra multiflora Phil. ex Stapf

Species of seed-bearing shrub

Ephedra multiflora is a species of Ephedra that is native to northern Chile and Northwest Argentina.

== Taxonomy ==
The plant was originally described by Rodolfo Armando Philippi, later formally published by Otto Stapf in 1887, and placed in section Ephedra sect. Alatae, "tribe" Habrolepides by Stapf in 1889.

In 1996 Robert A. Price left E. multiflora in section Alatae without recognizing a tribe.
