= E. nana =

E. nana may refer to:

- Endolimax nana, an amoebozoa species found in the intestines of humans
- Ericameria nana, the dwarf goldenbush or rubberweed, a flowering shrub species
- Eurycea nana, the San Marcos salamander, a small species of aquatic, lungless salamander species native to the United States

== Synonyms ==
- Ephedra nana, a synonym for Ephedra frustillata, the Patagonian ephedra, a plant species found in Patagonia

== See also ==
- Nana (disambiguation)
