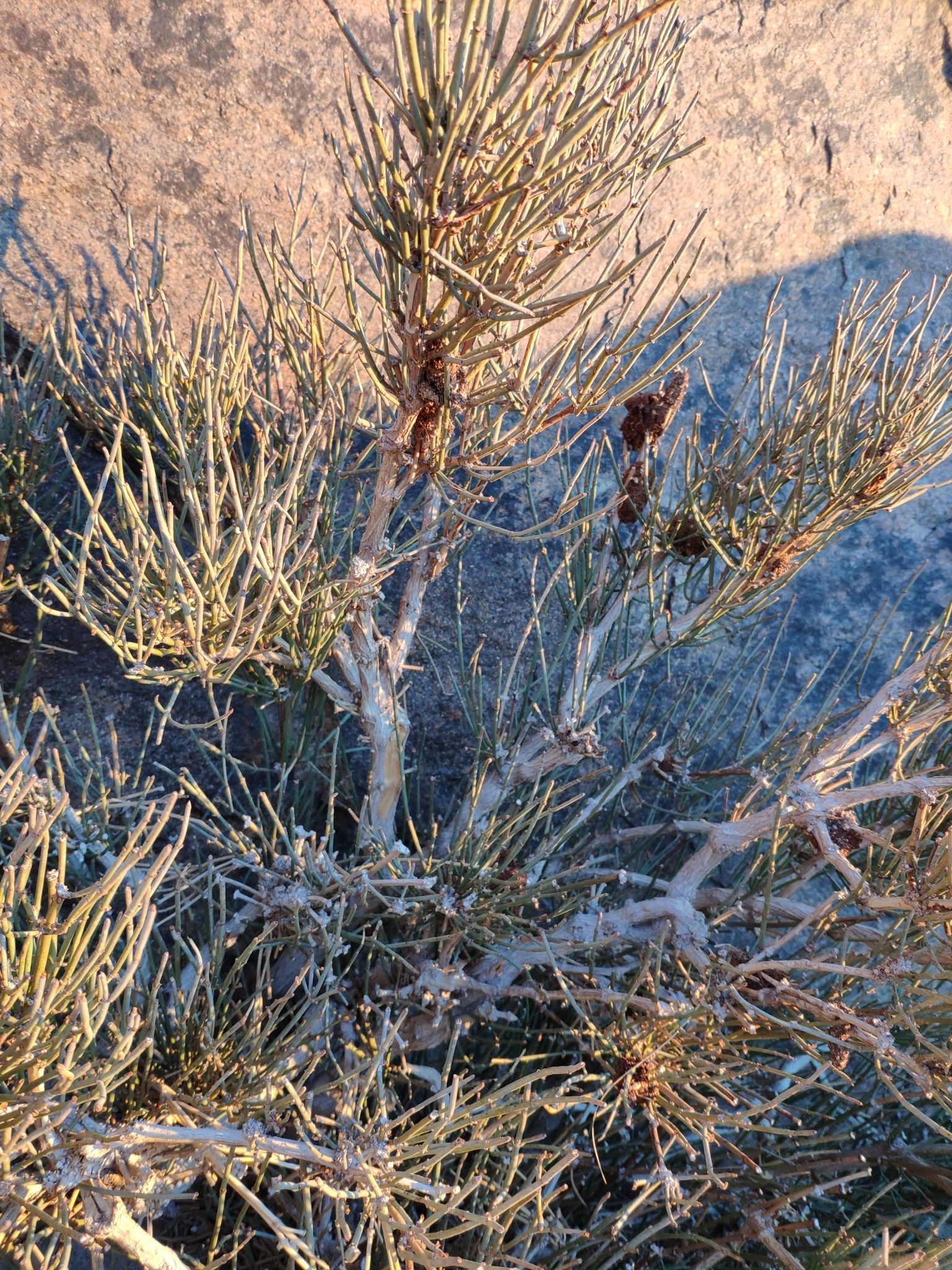

Conservation status
- Least Concern (IUCN 3.1)

Scientific classification
- Kingdom: Plantae
- Clade: Tracheophytes
- Clade: Gymnospermae
- Division: Gnetophyta
- Class: Gnetopsida
- Order: Ephedrales
- Family: Ephedraceae
- Genus: Ephedra
- Species: E. alata

Binomial name
- Ephedra alata Decne.

Synonyms
- Ephedra alenda (Stapf) Andr.

= Ephedra alata =

Species of seed-bearing shrub

Ephedra alata is a species of Ephedra. These plants are perennial and xerophytic gymnosperm shrubs.

== Description ==
Ephedra alata is a small terrestrial shrub or Chamaephyte. It is found primarily in dry desert environments. It is a dioecious shrub, usually less than 1 meter in height. This shrub has rigid and branched stems. This desert plant species does not possess spines and is non-succulent. The leaves are very short (about 3-6mm) and are united toward the base of the plant, forming leaf sheaths. The leafs are in opposite pairs at the nodes. The leaves are termed scale leaves because they are thick. This plant is known as conifer because the reproductive portions of this species are organized in yellow-green cones. The male, staminate cones are oval, 3-8mm long, organized in dense clusters, with 3-6 stipitate microsporangia. The female, or ovulate cones are found at the nodes of the stems. The ovulate cones are oval, up to 10mm long, with 4-5 pairs of overlapping yellow bracts surrounding two ovules. The seeds present in the ovulate cones are oval and acuminate in shape. This plant species flowing/fruiting season is between March and May. The roots of this plant are very fibrous and help the plant firmly anchor in sandy soil.

== Taxonomy ==
It was originally described by Joseph Decaisne in 1834 and placed in section Alatae, tribe Tropidolepides by Otto Stapf in 1889. In 1996 Robert A. Price left E. alata in section Alatae without recognizing a tribe.

== Subspecies ==
1. Ephedra alata subsp. alata - Algeria, Mauritania, Mali, Chad, Algeria, Sinai, Palestine, Israel, Lebanon, Syria, Iraq, Saudi Arabia
2. Ephedra alata subsp. alenda (Stapf) Trab. - Morocco, Mauritania, Algeria, Tunisia, Libya, Egypt
3. Ephedra alata subsp. monjauzeana Dubuis & Faurel - Algeria

== Distribution and habitat ==
This xerophytic shrub is found in desert and arid environments. It is native to many areas throughout northern Africa, mainly Morocco and the Sahara, and spanning throughout the Middle East. This shrub grows in dense clumps, on sandy calcareous, rocky and clay soils. This species is often found near Wadis or other arid sand dunes, with minimal water. This species grows between the elevations of 50 meters to 1200 meters. The plants diaspores are dispersed by strong winds. These plants fibrous roots help to anchor the plant in shifting sand dunes, control sand erosion and are tolerant to saline soils. The stem of this plant contain alkaloid ephedrine, and other antimicrobial chemicals, which help protect this plant from disease. This species is not considered for conservation concerns as it is wide-ranging across the globe and commonly found in its natural environments. Seeds from this species have been obtained and stored for the Millennium Seed Bank Project because it is unclear if this species population is sustainable with its wide range of uses.

== Uses ==
Ephedra alata is used for medicinal purposes. The stem of this plant contain alkaloid ephedrine which is a medicine used for the treatment of asthma and other respiratory ailments. Other chemicals are also present in the plant that are used for medicines. These medicines are used to treat circulatory disorders, kidney disorders, digestive system disorders and eye disorders. The stems and roots of this species is also used for it fibrous characteristic to make string, cords and twine. These portions may also be used for tannins, used in the process of dying or tanning materials. These plants are used for dye by grinding the plant portion, and placing the ground plant portions, with the desired dyed material in boiling water for 1–3 days. These plants are also used for consumption by animals such as camelidae, bovines and caprines.
