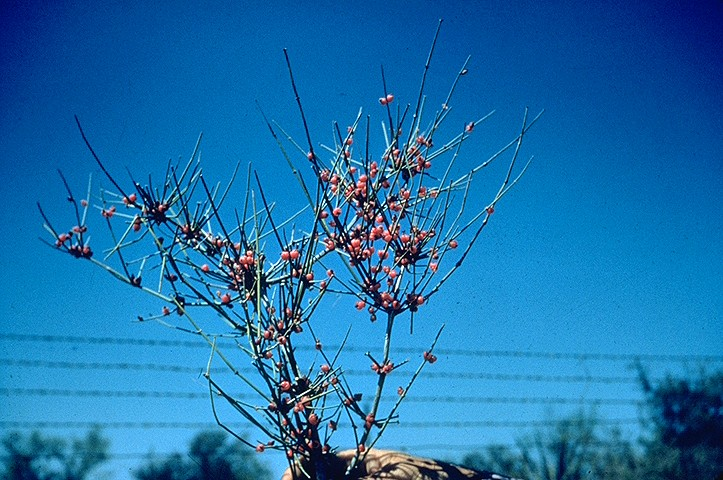

Conservation status
- Vulnerable (NatureServe)

Scientific classification
- Kingdom: Plantae
- Clade: Tracheophytes
- Clade: Gymnospermae
- Division: Gnetophyta
- Class: Gnetopsida
- Order: Ephedrales
- Family: Ephedraceae
- Genus: Ephedra
- Species: E. antisyphilitica

Binomial name
- Ephedra antisyphilitica Berland. ex C.A. Mey. 1846

Synonyms
- Ephedra occidentalis Torr. ex Parl.; Ephedra texana E.L.Reed

= Ephedra antisyphilitica =

Species of seed-bearing shrub

Ephedra antisyphilitica is a plant species native to the southern Great Plains of the United States (Oklahoma, New Mexico, Texas), and also to northeastern Mexico (Nuevo León, Coahuila, San Luis Potosí).

This species should not be confused with the 1871 name Ephedra antisyphilitica S.Wats., native to further west in the Southwestern US and in Baja California. Meyer's use of the name dates from 1846, so it has priority over Watson's later application of the same name to a different plant. Watson's plant is now called Ephedra nevadensis.

== Genome size ==
The 1C genome size of Ephedra antisyphilitica has been estimated at 38.34pg, which is the largest genome reported for any gymnosperm, although as the species is octoploid the monoploid (1Cx) genome is only 9.58pg.
