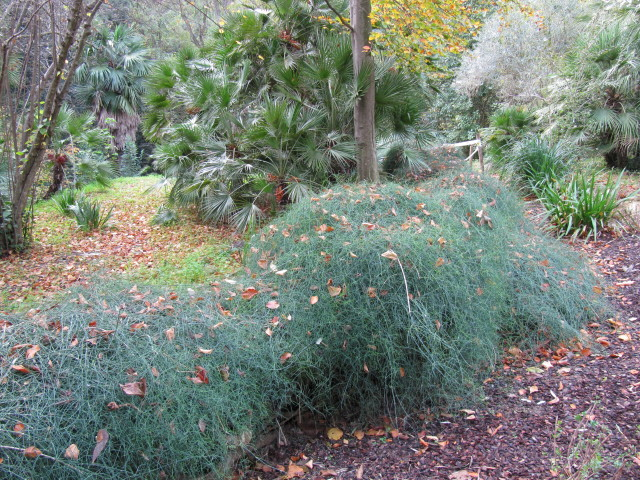

Conservation status
- Least Concern (IUCN 3.1)

Scientific classification
- Kingdom: Plantae
- Clade: Tracheophytes
- Clade: Gymnospermae
- Division: Gnetophyta
- Class: Gnetopsida
- Order: Ephedrales
- Family: Ephedraceae
- Genus: Ephedra
- Species: E. altissima

Binomial name
- Ephedra altissima Desf.

Synonyms
- Chaetocladus altissima (Desf.) J.Nelson; Ephedra altissima Desf. ssp. algerica Stapf; Ephedra altissima Desf. ssp. mauritanica Stapf; Ephedra altissima Desf. ssp. scabra Trab. Ephedra altissima Desf. ssp. tripolitana Pamp. Ephedra altissima Desf. ssp. nana Ball; Chaetocladus altissima (Desf.) J.Nelson; Ephedra wettsteinii Buxb.

= Ephedra altissima =

Species of seed-bearing shrub

Ephedra altissima is a species of Ephedra that is native to the western Sahara (Morocco, Algeria, Tunisia, Libya, Chad, Mauritania), and also to the Canary Islands.

The species is cultivated as an ornamental plant and medicinal plant.

== Habitat ==
This plant is located in Algeria, Chad, Libya, Mauritania, Morocco, Spain, Tunisia, and the western Sahara. It can be viewed at elevations between 10 meters to 700 meters above sea level.

== Characteristics ==
This plant is described as a green, dioecious shrub. Each flower is either male or female needing two different for seed formation. It prefers well drained, loamy soil in an area with direct sunlight. Once established the plant is hardy, resistant to drought and lime. The leaves bud in an opposite fashion with the plant being green all year. A shrub often found on rocky calcareous slopes. Flowering time is between February–May. Fruiting time is between April–May. The ripe female cone is eaten by animals.

== Taxonomy ==
It was originally described by René Louiche Desfontaines in 1799 and placed in section Pseudobaccatae (=sect. Ephedra), "tribe" Scandentes. This being due to the similarity in stem and leaf structure and organization.

In 1996 Robert A. Price classified E. altissima in section Ephedra without recognizing a tribe.

== Threat ==
As a result of the plant having such a widespread location, there are no specific major threats. This plant was last assessed by IUCN on August 13, 2010, with a least concerned rating. Due to the non-concerned attitude toward the endangerment of the species, no seeds have been collected as an ex situ conservation measure. It is not known to occur in any protected areas.

== Medicinal uses ==
The members of this genus have alkaloid ephedrine which are integral in the treatment of asthma and other related respiratory issues. By using the entire plant and not just the stem it has been observed, as compared to isolated ephedrine, to have few side effects. This is used to treat symptoms not cure respiratory issues. Young plants have the best potency if ingested raw while older plants are best to be dried and used in a tea.

== Varieties ==
1. Ephedra altissima var. altissima - Morocco, Algeria, Tunisia, Libya, Mauritania, Canary Islands
2. Ephedra altissima var. tibestica Maire - Tibesti Mountains of northern Chad
