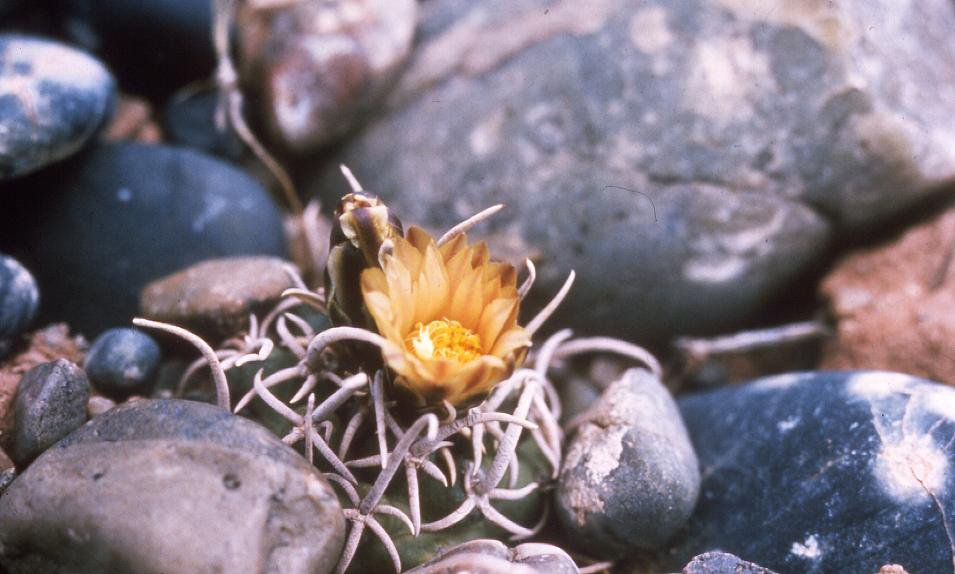

Conservation status
- Critically Imperiled (NatureServe)
- CITES Appendix I (CITES)

Scientific classification
- Kingdom: Plantae
- Clade: Tracheophytes
- Clade: Angiosperms
- Clade: Eudicots
- Order: Caryophyllales
- Family: Cactaceae
- Subfamily: Cactoideae
- Genus: Pediocactus
- Species: P. peeblesianus

Binomial name
- Pediocactus peeblesianus (Croizat) L.D.Benson

Synonyms
- Echinocactus peeblesianus (Croizat) L.D.Benson 1950; Navajoa peeblesiana Croizat 1943; Neonavajoa peeblesiana (Croizat) Doweld 1999; Toumeya peeblesiana (Croizat) W.T.Marshall 1947; Utahia peeblesiana (Croizat) Kladiwa 1969; Navajoa durispina Y.Itô 1981; Navajoa fickeiseniorum Backeb. 1960; Navajoa peeblesiana var. fickeisenii Backeb. ex Hochstätter 1994; Navajoa peeblesiana subsp. fickeisenii (Backeb. ex Hochstätter) Hochstätter 1995; Navajoa peeblesiana f. maia Hochstätter 1999; Navajoa peeblesiana subsp. menzelii (Hochstätter) Hochstätter 2007; Navajoa peeblesiana f. menzelii Hochstätter 1999; Neonavajoa peeblesiana subsp. fickeisenii (Backeb. ex Hochstätter) Doweld 1999; Pediocactus peeblesianus subsp. fickeisenii (Backeb. ex Hochstätter) Lüthy 1999; Pediocactus peeblesianus var. fickeisenii (Backeb. ex Hochstätter) L.D.Benson 1962; Pediocactus peeblesianus var. maianus L.D.Benson 1969; Pediocactus peeblesianus f. maius (Hochstätter) Hájek 2000; Pediocactus peeblesianus f. menzelii (Hochstätter) Hájek 2000; Toumeya fickeiseniorum (Backeb.) Earle 1963

= Pediocactus peeblesianus =

Species of cactus

Pediocactus peeblesianus is a rare species of cactus known by the common names Navajo pincushion cactus. It is endemic to the state of Arizona in the United States. The species is named after the Arizona botanist Robert Hibbs Peebles.

== Description ==
This petite cactus grows up to 6.5 centimeters tall by about 5.5 wide. It is grayish green in color and generally spherical or egg-shaped. Sometimes only the top is visible above the soil and the whole cactus body may shrink and disappear under the soil in dry times. Each circular, hairy areole on the surface of the cactus has a few spines, the longest of which may exceed 2 centimeters in length, marginal spines are 2 to 10 mm long. The spines are mostly corky and flexible but have hard tips and are white or dull in color. The funnel-shaped yellowish flowers are up to 2.5 centimeters wide blooming from April to May. The fruit is green, ripening reddish-brown, reaches about a centimeter long, and contain about 5 to 10 dark brown to black seeds .

=== Subspecies ===
This species is divided into two subspecies, but these are sometimes referred to as varieties. One subspecies of the plant is federally listed as an endangered species of the U.S.

Image	Subspecies	Description	
	Pediocactus peeblesianus subsp. fickeisenii (Backeb. ex Hochstätter) Lüthy	More widespread subspecies	Arizona
	Pediocactus peeblesianus subsp. peeblesianus	the Peebles Navajo cactus, is a rare and endangered taxon that has a mycorrhizal association with Glomus deserticola and other fungi.	Limited to a small strip of desert in Navajo County, Arizona, near Joseph City and Holbrook.

== Habitat ==
The species occurs in desert habitat and the transition to Great Basin grassland habitat at elevations of 1450 to 1600 meters. It grows in sandy soil and among rocks. Drought has been a significant threat to this cactus in recent years.
