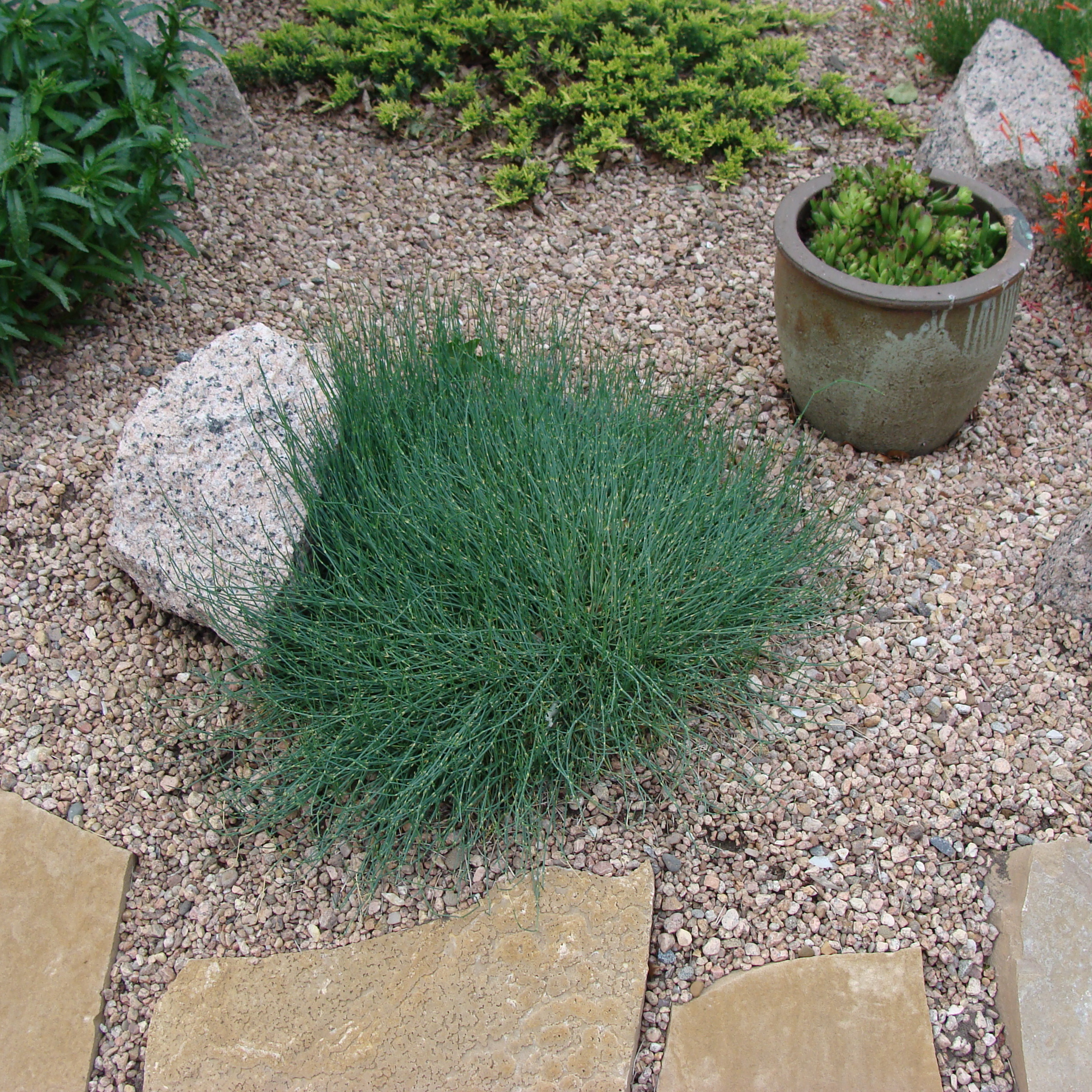

Conservation status
- Least Concern (IUCN 3.1)

- Vulnerable (NatureServe)

Scientific classification
- Kingdom: Plantae
- Clade: Tracheophytes
- Clade: Gymnospermae
- Division: Gnetophyta
- Class: Gnetopsida
- Order: Ephedrales
- Family: Ephedraceae
- Genus: Ephedra
- Species: E. funerea

Binomial name
- Ephedra funerea Coville & C. V. Morton

= Ephedra funerea =

Death Valley jointfir

Species of seed-bearing shrub

Ephedra funerea is a species of Ephedra, known by the common name Death Valley jointfir, Death Valley ephedra, or Mormon Tea.

It is native to the Mojave Desert of California, Arizona and Nevada. It is named after a population in the Funeral Mountains, in Death Valley National Park.

Native Americans and Mormon pioneers drank a tea brewed from this plant called Mormon Tea or Indian Tea.

== Description ==
The Ephedra funerea shrub is made up of erect twigs which are gray-green when new and age to gray and cracked. There are tiny leaves at nodes along the twigs. Male plants produce pollen cones at the nodes which are up to 8 millimeters long, and female plants produce seed cones which are slightly longer and may grow on stalks.
