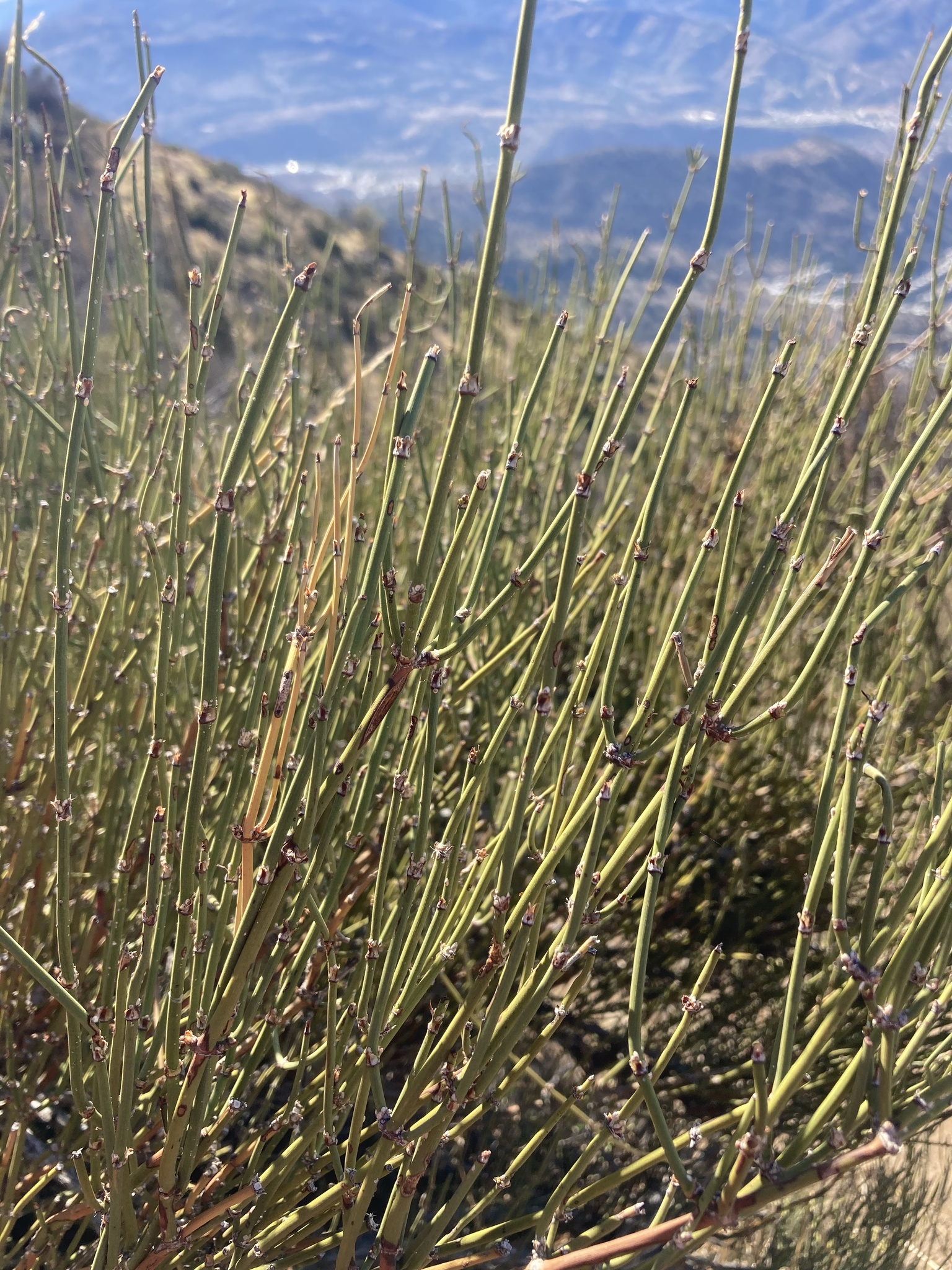
- Ephedra chilensis in Cerro Manquehue, Metropolitan region, Chile

Scientific classification
- Kingdom: Plantae
- Clade: Tracheophytes
- Clade: Gymnospermae
- Division: Gnetophyta
- Class: Gnetopsida
- Order: Ephedrales
- Family: Ephedraceae
- Genus: Ephedra
- Species: E. chilensis

Binomial name
- Ephedra chilensis C. Presl

Synonyms
- Ephedra americana var. andina (Poepp. ex C.A.Mey.) Stapf; Ephedra andina Poepp. ex C.A.Mey.; Ephedra araucana Phil.; Ephedra bracteata Miers, not validly publ.; Ephedra chilensis Miers, nom. illeg.; Ephedra dumosa Miers; Ephedra monticola Miers

= Ephedra chilensis =

Species of plant

Ephedra chilensis, also known as pingo-pingo, is a species of plant in the division Gnetophyta. It is native to Chile, Argentina, Bolivia and Peru. In Chile, it is distributed between the Arica and Parinacota region and the Araucania region.
