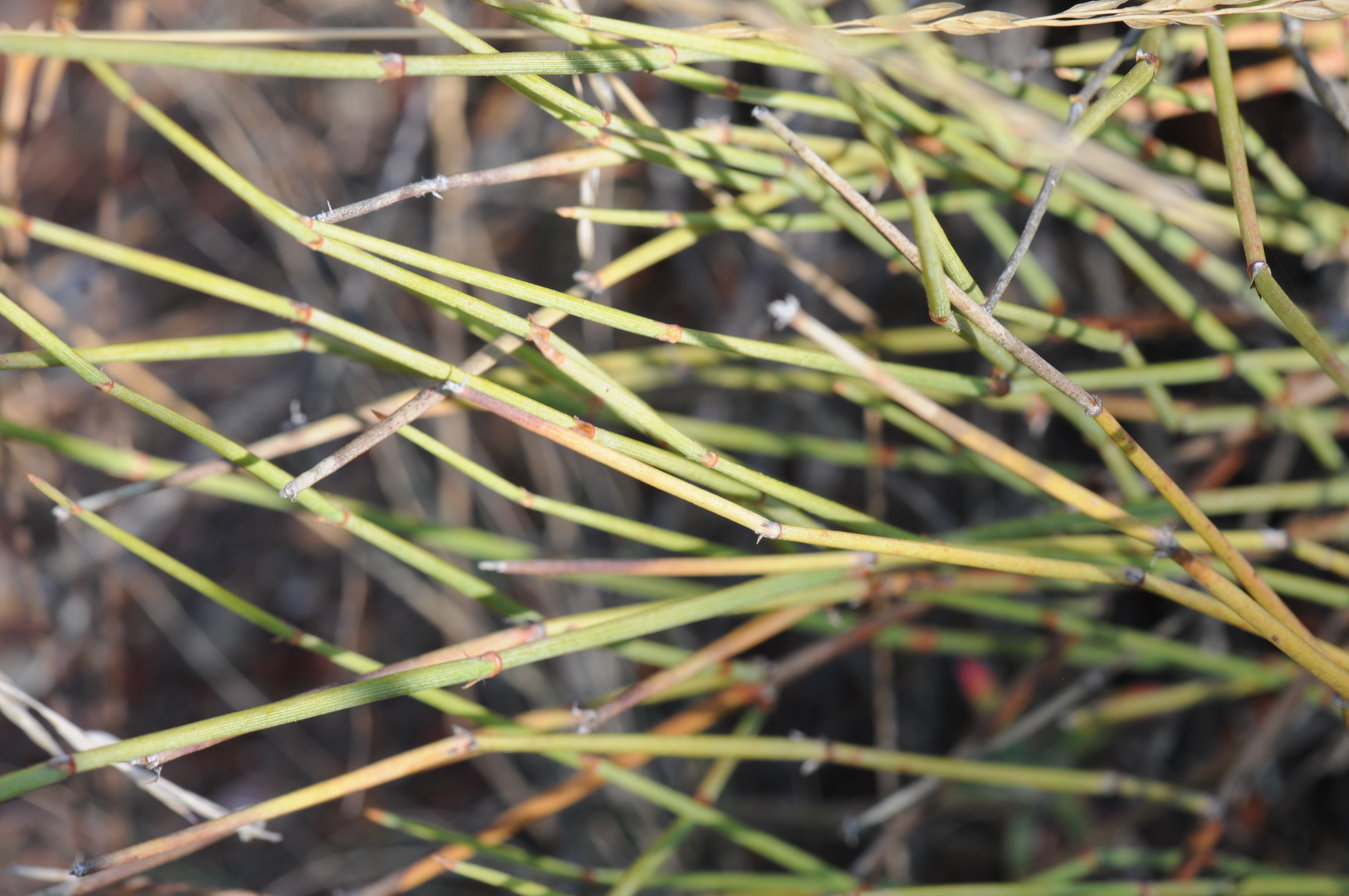

Scientific classification
- Kingdom: Plantae
- Clade: Tracheophytes
- Clade: Gymnospermae
- Division: Gnetophyta
- Class: Gnetopsida
- Order: Ephedrales
- Family: Ephedraceae
- Genus: Ephedra
- Species: E. trifurca

Binomial name
- Ephedra trifurca Torr. ex S.Wats.

= Ephedra trifurca =

Species of seed-bearing shrub

Ephedra trifurca is a species of Ephedra known by the common names longleaf jointfir and Mexican tea.

It is native to the states of Baja California, Chihuahua and Sonora in northwestern Mexico, and to California, Arizona, New Mexico, Texas in the Southwestern United States. It is found in desert scrub plant communities, in the Chihuahuan Desert, Sonoran Desert, and Colorado Desert.

== Description ==
Ephedra trifurca is a sprawling shrub that can approach 2 metres (6.6 ft) in height. It is made up of erect, sharp-pointed twigs which are light green when young and age to yellowish or greenish gray.

It has curling, pointed leaves at its nodes which are up to 1.5 centimeters long and persistent.

Male plants produce pollen cones at the nodes, each up to a centimeter long, and female plants produce seed cones which are slightly larger and each contain one seed in a papery envelope.

== See also ==
- Mexican-tea
