= Apigeninidin =

Apigeninidin (chloride)

Names
- Other names 3-desoxy- pelargonidin 5,7-dihydroxy-2-(4-hydroxyphenyl)benzopyrilium chloride

Identifiers
CAS Number	1151-98-0
3D model (JSmol)	Interactive image
ChEMBL	ChEMBL590784
ChemSpider	140151
PubChem CID	441647
UNII	CWI2JJB0W1
CompTox Dashboard (EPA)	DTXSID40921629
- InChI: InChI=1S/C15H10O4.ClH/c16-10-3-1-9(2-4-10)14-6-5-12-13(18)7-11(17)8-15(12)19-14;/h1-8H,(H2-,16,17,18);1H Key: GYQDOAKHUGURPD-UHFFFAOYSA-N
- SMILES: [Cl-].Oc1ccc(cc1)c3[o+]c2cc(O)cc(O)c2cc3

Properties
Chemical formula	C_{15}H_{11}O_{4}+
Molar mass	255.24 g/mol
- Except where otherwise noted, data are given for materials in their standard state (at 25 °C [77 °F], 100 kPa). verify (what is ?) Infobox references

Apigeninidin (Also, apigenidin, or Gesneridin) is a chemical compound belonging to the 3-deoxyanthocyanidins and that can be found in the Patagonian plant Ephedra frustillata and in the soybean. Apigeninidin is one of the principal pigments found in sorghum. Extremely high level of apigeninidin (49 mg/g) has been documented in sorghum leaf sheath. Like all anthocyanidins it exists in a variety of tautomers depending on pH and hydration, several of these bare the distinctive pyrylium core.
