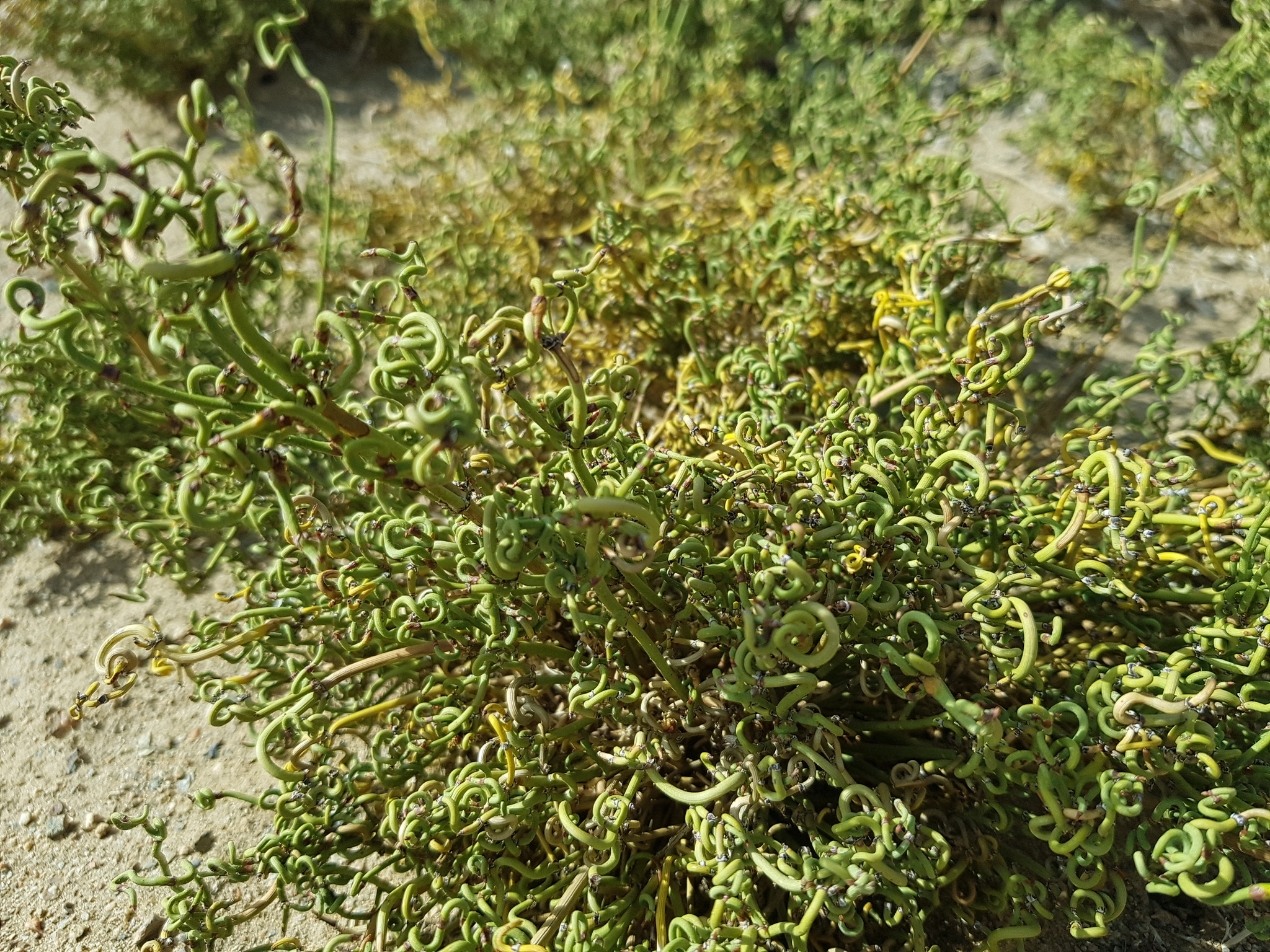

Scientific classification
- Kingdom: Plantae
- Clade: Tracheophytes
- Clade: Gymnospermae
- Division: Gnetophyta
- Class: Gnetopsida
- Order: Ephedrales
- Family: Ephedraceae
- Genus: Ephedra
- Species: E. przewalskii

Binomial name
- Ephedra przewalskii Stapf

= Ephedra przewalskii =

Species of seed-bearing shrub

Ephedra przewalskii is a species of Ephedra that is native to Central Asia, Mongolia, Pakistan, and parts of China (Gansu, Inner Mongolia, Ningxia, Qinghai, and Tibet).

It was originally described by Otto Stapf in 1889 and placed in section Alatae, tribe Tropidolepides. In 1996 Robert A. Price left E. przewalskii in section Alatae without recognizing a tribe.
