= Ephedra pedunculata =

Clap-weed

Scientific classification
- Kingdom: Plantae
- Clade: Tracheophytes
- Clade: Gymnospermae
- Division: Gnetophyta
- Class: Gnetopsida
- Order: Ephedrales
- Family: Ephedraceae
- Genus: Ephedra
- Species: E. pedunculata

Binomial name
- Ephedra pedunculata Engelm. ex S. Watson

Species of seed-bearing shrub

Ephedra pedunculata, common name vine Mormon tea or Comida de Vívora, is a plant species native to southern Texas and to Mexico as far south as Zacatecas. It grows in sandy or rocky slopes and outcrops.

Most species of Ephedra (called "Mormon tea") are shrubs, but Ephedra pedunculata is a trailing or clambering woody vine up to 7 m (23 ft) long. Bark is gray, becoming cracked with age. Leaves are opposite, up to 3 mm (0.12 in) long. Microsporangial (pollen-producing cones) are 1–2 mm long, compared to less than 1 mm in many other species. Seed cones are 6–10 mm (0.24–0.39 in) long, each containing 2 ellipsoid seeds 4–10 mm (0.16–0.39 in) long.

This plant is also rich in flavonoids, which is used in a variety of nutraceutical, pharmaceutical and cosmetic applications.
