= Ephedra boelckei =

Scientific classification
- Kingdom: Plantae
- Clade: Tracheophytes
- Clade: Gymnospermae
- Division: Gnetophyta
- Class: Gnetopsida
- Order: Ephedrales
- Family: Ephedraceae
- Genus: Ephedra
- Species: E. boelckei

Binomial name
- Ephedra boelckei F.A.Roig

Species of seed-bearing shrub

Ephedra boelckei is a species of Ephedra that is native to Argentina.

It was originally described by Fidel Antonio Roig in 1984. It has been placed in section Alatae.
