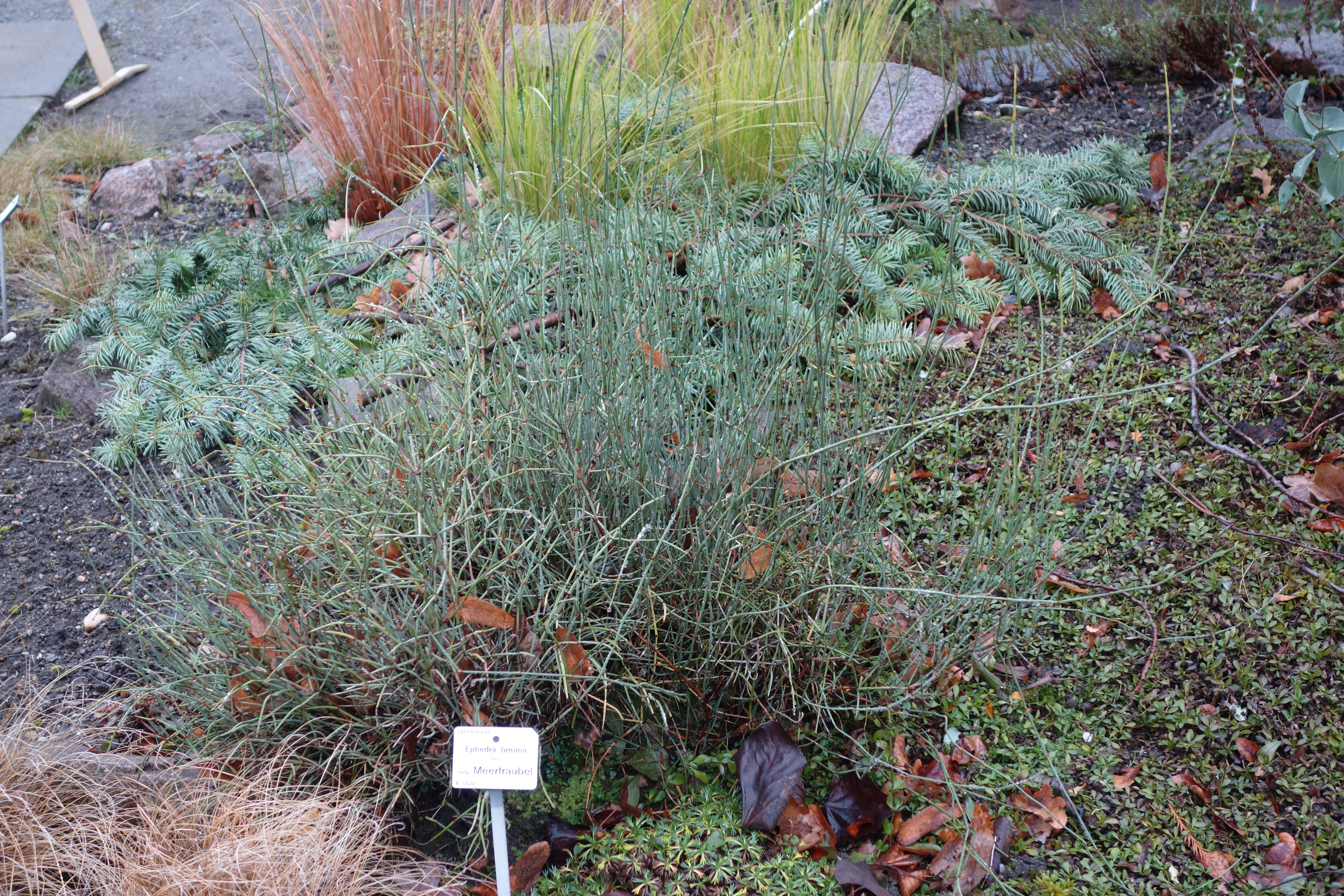

Conservation status
- Least Concern (IUCN 3.1)

Scientific classification
- Kingdom: Plantae
- Clade: Tracheophytes
- Clade: Gymnospermae
- Division: Gnetophyta
- Class: Gnetopsida
- Order: Ephedrales
- Family: Ephedraceae
- Genus: Ephedra
- Species: E. breana

Binomial name
- Ephedra breana Phil.

= Ephedra breana =

Species of seed-bearing shrub

Ephedra breana (frutilla de campo, pingo-pingo) is a species of Ephedra growing from northwest Argentina through to Chile and Bolivia.

== Synonyms ==
- Ephedra haenkeana Tocl
- Ephedra wraithiana I.M.Johnst.
