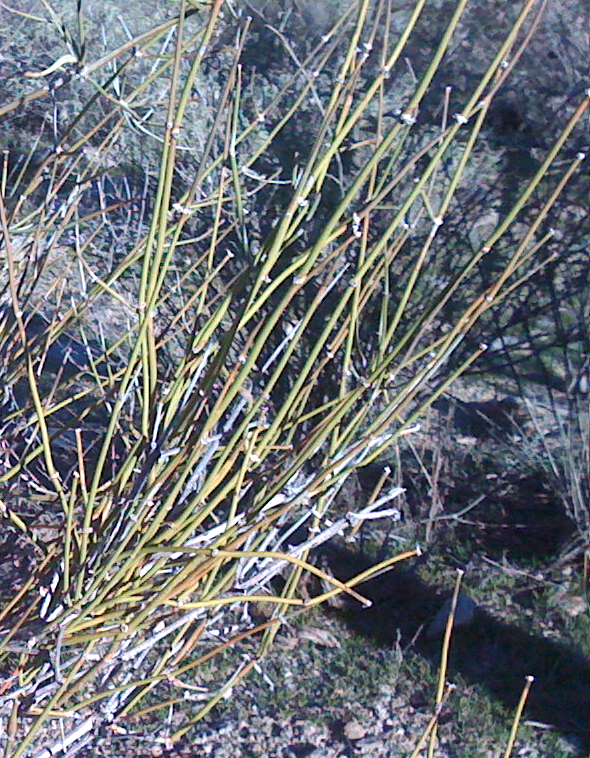

Conservation status
- Least Concern (IUCN 3.1)

- Vulnerable (NatureServe)

Scientific classification
- Kingdom: Plantae
- Clade: Tracheophytes
- Clade: Gymnospermae
- Division: Gnetophyta
- Class: Gnetopsida
- Order: Ephedrales
- Family: Ephedraceae
- Genus: Ephedra
- Species: E. fasciculata

Binomial name
- Ephedra fasciculata A.Nelson

Synonyms
- Ephedra clokeyi H.C.Cutler

= Ephedra fasciculata =

Species of seed-bearing shrub

Ephedra fasciculata is a species of plant in the Ephedraceae family. Common names are Arizona ephedra, Arizona joint-fir, and desert Mormon-tea.

== Distribution ==
The plant is found in the Mojave Desert and Colorado Desert of California, the Sonoran Desert in Arizona, Nevada, southern California, and Utah. Ephedra fasciculata grows in Creosote-bush scrub (Larrea tridentata), below 1,500 feet (460 m).

== Varieties ==
- Ephedra fasciculata var. clokeyi (H. C. Cutler) Clokey
- Ephedra fasciculata var. fasciculata
