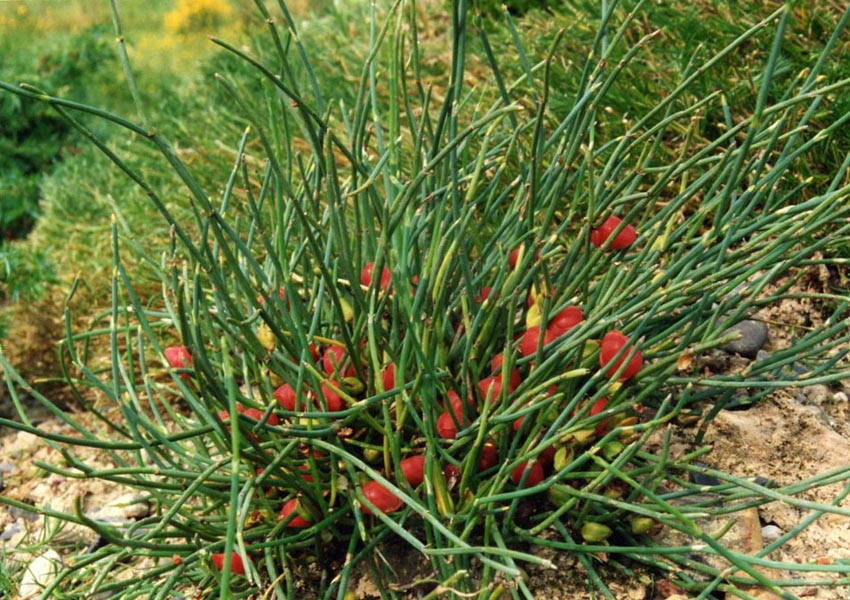
- Matured red and fleshy cones of E. monosperma

Conservation status
- Least Concern (IUCN 3.1)

Scientific classification
- Kingdom: Plantae
- Clade: Tracheophytes
- Clade: Gymnospermae
- Division: Gnetophyta
- Class: Gnetopsida
- Order: Ephedrales
- Family: Ephedraceae
- Genus: Ephedra
- Species: E. monosperma

Binomial name
- Ephedra monosperma J. G. Gmel. ex C. A. Mey.

Synonyms
- Ephedra minima K.S. Hao

= Ephedra monosperma =

Species of plant

Ephedra monosperma, also called Ephedra minima or dan zi ma huang (in Chinese), is small shrub in the family of Ephedraceae.

It is distributed from China to Siberia and found growing in rocky slopes or dry places. Its ephedrine extract has been used in traditional medicine in China and Japan, but is banned in USA since 1994 for causing various adverse effects.

== Description ==
Ephedra monosperma is perennial small shrub that ranges 5 cm to 15 cm high, often with creeping runners. The woody stems are much branched and short, 1–5 cm, and have knotted nodes. Branchlets are spreading and slim usually with slight curved shape. Internodes of branchlets are 1–3 cm long, 1 mm in diameter.

The leaves are opposite, basal 1/3–2/3 connate their length. There is one ovule in each cone that is enclosed by two pairs of cone bracts. Pollen cones, consist of three or four pairs of decussate scales with broad margin, are oblong-spherical shaped, sessile or subsessile at nodes and paired or rarely solitary.

Bracts of pollen cones are in two to four pairs, 1/2 connate their length. It pollinates in June, has matured seeds in August, and flowers from May. Seed cones are solitary or opposite at nodes, sessile, and ovoid at maturity. The mature cones are fleshy, red, and glucose, 6–9 mm long, 5–8 mm across.

== Habitat and distribution ==
Ephedra monosperma is found growing in crevices of limestone, cliffs, and rocky slopes, sometimes on the rocks on slope of river valleys often with sparse Juniperus and shrub vegetation. It is also often found in dry pine forests.

E. monosperma is mainly distributed in these Asian locations: Afghanistan, China (Beijing, Chongqing, Gansu, Guizhou, Hebei, Hubei, Nei Monggol, Ningxia, Qinghai, Shandong, Shanxi, Sichuan, Tianjin, Xinjiang, and Yunnan) Tibet, Kazakhstan, Mongolia, Pakistan, and Russia (Buryatiya, Chita, Irkutsk, Krasnoyarsk, Tuva, and Yakutiya).

== Uses ==
=== Medicine ===
Ephedrae herbs which includes Ephedra monosperma has been used in Chinese and Japanese medicine for several thousand years. The pharmacological effect of Ephedra medicine is in wide range: increase in heart rate and elevation of blood pressure against heart block or postural hypotension, constriction of peripheral blood vessels, bronchodilation against bronchial asthma, CNS stimulation against narcolepsy or depression, and urine retention against urinary incontinence.

The pure alkaloid ephedrine from the Ephedra herbs is popular for effective medicine for asthma, especially because it can be given by mouth unlike adrenaline.

Ephedrine products are banned in U.S.A since 1994 for causing various and serious adverse effects, such as headache, insomnia, stroke, arrhythmias, myocardial infarction, psychosis, heart palpitations, cardiac arrest and even death.

=== Tea ===
To make Mongolia tea, dried mature seed-cones of Ephedra monosperma are mixed with white tea or herbs, taken with or without cream and milk.
