= Ephedra rhytidosperma =

Scientific classification
- Kingdom: Plantae
- Clade: Tracheophytes
- Clade: Gymnospermae
- Division: Gnetophyta
- Class: Gnetopsida
- Order: Ephedrales
- Family: Ephedraceae
- Genus: Ephedra
- Species: E. rhytidosperma

Binomial name
- Ephedra rhytidosperma Pachom.

Synonyms
- Ephedra lepidosperma C.Y.Cheng

Species of seed-bearing shrub

Ephedra rhytidosperma, synonym Ephedra lepidosperma, common name li jiang ma huang, is a shrub native to North-central China, Inner Mongolia and Mongolia. It grows in mountainous areas at an elevation of 2300–4200 m.
