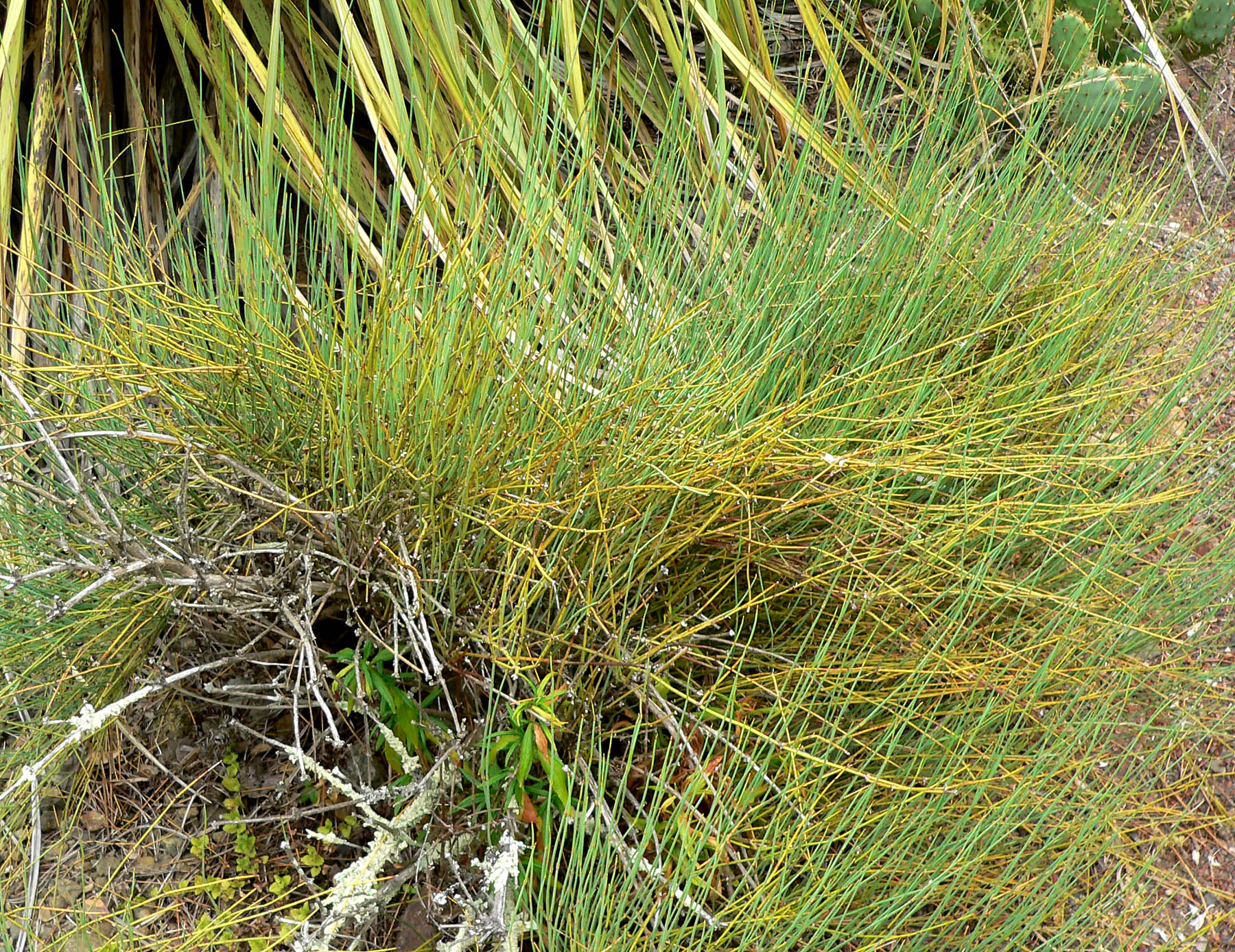

Conservation status
- Vulnerable (NatureServe)

Scientific classification
- Kingdom: Plantae
- Clade: Tracheophytes
- Clade: Gymnospermae
- Division: Gnetophyta
- Class: Gnetopsida
- Order: Ephedrales
- Family: Ephedraceae
- Genus: Ephedra
- Species: E. californica

Binomial name
- Ephedra californica S.Wats.

= Ephedra californica =

Species of seed-bearing shrub

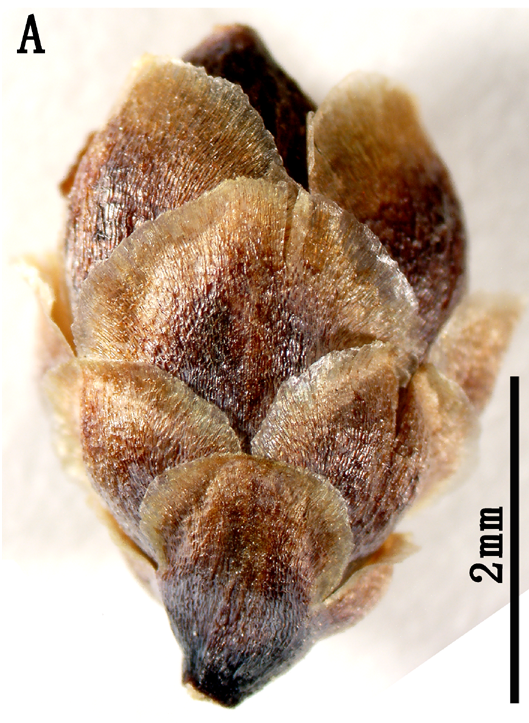
An Ephedra californica cone

Ephedra californica is a species of Ephedra, known by the common names California jointfir, California ephedra, desert tea, Mormon tea, and cañatillo.

== Distribution ==
The plant is native to many diverse areas of central and southern California, Baja California, and west Arizona. It grows in varied scrub and open habitats, including chaparral, arid grassland, and Creosote scrub. It is found at elevations from 150–3,400 feet (46–1,036 m).

Regions and landforms of distribution include:

- Mojave Desert
- Sonoran Desert
- Colorado Desert
- Peninsular Ranges
- Transverse Ranges
- Tehachapi Mountains
- Southern Sierra Nevada foothills
- San Joaquin Valley
- South California Coast Ranges
- Channel Islands
- Southern California coastal basins (undeveloped habitats)

Habitats include:

- California chaparral and woodlands
  - California coastal sage and chaparral ecoregion
  - California montane chaparral and woodlands ecoregion
  - California interior chaparral and woodlands

== Description ==
Ephedra californica is a spindly shrub made up of twigs which are greenish when new and age to a yellowish-gray color and have fine longitudinal grooves on their surfaces. The bark becomes gray-brown, and irregularly fissured and cracked. It grows 0.25–1 metre (0.82–3.28 ft) in height, with similar spread.

The tiny leaves grow at nodes on the twigs and dry in drought, to crumble away to leave brownish ridges there. Male plants produce clumps of pollen cones at the nodes and female plants produce egg-shaped seed cones each about 1 centimetre (0.39 in) long, May to June.

== Native American uses ==
Ephedra californica was used by the indigenous peoples of California as a medicinal plant, culinary ingredient, and for making tools. Tribal people using it included the Kumeyaay—Diegueño and Kawaiisu of present-day Southern California. The branches of the Ephedra californica were frequently brewed for its medicinal properties. The Kumeyaay used the tea of the Ephedra californica to cleanse the blood and kidneys and as an appetite suppressant.
