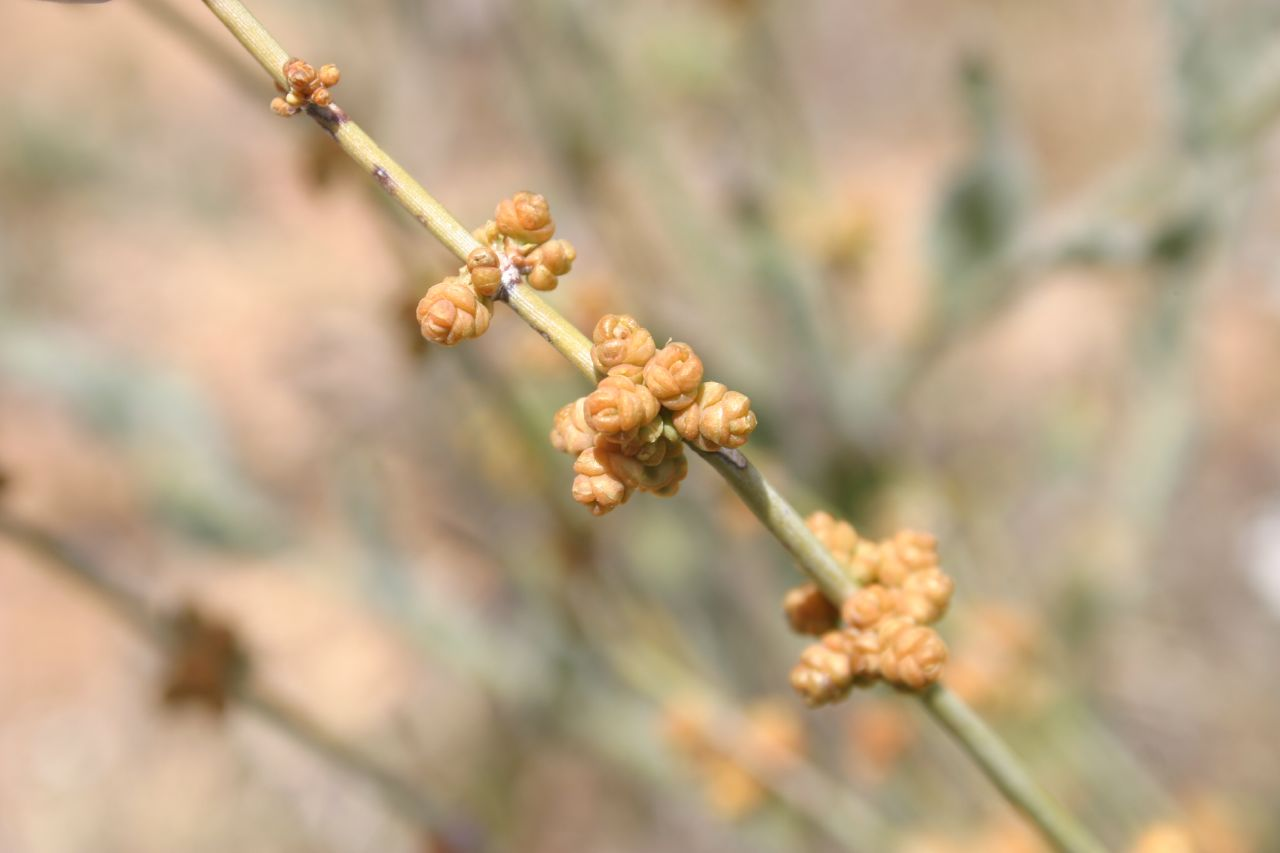

Conservation status
- Least Concern (IUCN 3.1)

Scientific classification
- Kingdom: Plantae
- Clade: Tracheophytes
- Clade: Gymnospermae
- Division: Gnetophyta
- Class: Gnetopsida
- Order: Ephedrales
- Family: Ephedraceae
- Genus: Ephedra
- Species: E. nevadensis

Binomial name
- Ephedra nevadensis S.Wats.

Synonyms
- Ephedra antisyphilitica S.Wats. 1871, illegitimate homonym, not Berland. ex C.A. Mey. 1846

= Ephedra nevadensis =

Species of seed-bearing shrub

Ephedra nevadensis, commonly known as Nevada ephedra, gray ephedra, Mormon tea and Nevada jointfir, is a species of gymnosperm native to dry areas of western North America.

Its range extends west to California, east to Colorado, north to Oregon, and south to Baja California, including areas of the Great Basin, Colorado Plateau and desert Southwest. It is found in rocky and sandy soils, generally in areas without trees. It can be found in a variety of environments but predominately grows in desert climates.

It serves as a non toxic grazing source to both wild and domestic livestock. It possesses a various amount of medicinal properties that can be used in a domestic setting. Historically, it is known for its usage in Mormon communities as tea.

== Ecology ==
Ephedra nevadensis can grow across a vast variety of biomes including but not limited to shrub lands, desert climates, wooded areas as well as salty deserts. Growing in an arid climate does present threats to Ephedra nevadensis. In particular, regional fires do sometimes occur but is not a common event due to the lack of foliage that would serve as fuel. The plants ability to re-establish from such an occurrence is directly related to length of burning season and fire severity.

== Evolutionary history of seed dispersal ==
One study analyzed the reproductive ecology of various structures related to methods for seed dispersal across multiple Ephedra species. The resulting conclusion was that across ten separate species located in the arid climate of southwestern north America, structural diversity amongst the seeds/cones were able to be categorized into three types depending on location and dispersal type. Species that utilize wind dispersal were found to have light, winged structures on seed cones whereas some species had colorful seed components were adapted to captivate the attention of birds, their main seed dispersal method. The cones/seeds of Ephedra nevadensis were found have components of both animal and wind dispersal. As with many various plant species, reproductive means of seed dispersal is directly influenced by external factors such as animal populations and climate conditions, the study indicated that Ephedra species are no exception to this principle.

== Reproduction ==
Ephedra nevadensis lacks the usual biological benefits of a biotic relationship compared to other native species of plants. Animals that would otherwise benefit from such relationship gleaning nutritional foliage such as leaves, or the nectar of flowering buds would be more inclined to stray away from this species of Ephedra in instances of survival. In conjecture to this, the Ephedra species is much less capable of having other options of cross-pollination such as insect pollination or any other form of biotic pollination.

Nevada ephedra is wind-pollinated, with male plants growing in dryer areas and female plants growing in wetter ones, an arrangement which is believed to increase the production of seed. Cones mature and pollination occurs in March to June, with seeds ripening in May to August, although seeds are not produced every year. In the wild, seeds are often spread by rodents, and for cultivation, seeds can readily be collected and sown. The plant can also be propagated via transplants and cuttings.

The absence of foliage is beneficial when it comes to gamete dispersal. The feature of having less foliage creates a better means of allowing wind to carry pollen, allowing for a more predictable and systematic form of pollination to occur. Although not typically grazed on by smaller rodents and insects, Ephedra nevadensis is commonly grazed on by larger livestock such as cattle and sheep.

More than other North American Ephedra species, it is a significant forage plant. It is grazed upon by mule deer (Odocoileus hemionus), pronghorn (Antilocapra americana), and desert bighorn sheep (Ovis canadensis) as well as domestic sheep.

== Grazing benefits and toxicity ==
A study was conducted to determine a better understanding of the nutritional potency of Ephedra nevadensis compared Ephedra with orchardgrass hay (Dactylis glomerata) and cheatgrass (Bromus tectorum). It was determined that Ephedra scored second in terms of having the most ammoniacal nitrogen, while also scoring highest in ruminal pH. Results produced that Ephedra could be used as a grazing alternative but cannot be determined as exceptional in terms of nutrition or toxicity. In another study conducted to determine the toxicity of two different varieties of Ephedra (viridis, nevadensis) focusing on maternal and fetal toxicity in livestock, it was concluded that Ephedra nevadensis showed no dietary abnormalities or signs of ailment or toxicity in both the material party and offspring.

== Uses ==
Ephedra nevadensis was used for food and medicine by Native Americans and for tea by Mormons. Currently, its biggest use is as forage for sheep and cattle (it is not as good for horses), and for habitat restoration. It is sometimes grown for ornamental purposes. Among the Zuni people an infusion of the whole plant, except for the root, is taken for syphilis. They also use it to make a tea-like beverage.

== Medicinal properties ==
Typically the stems are harvested for their beneficial health effects which include helping combat fluid build up and purifying blood. It can be used to treat gonorrhea, early stages of syphilis, topical sores, kidney issues and symptoms associated with respiratory problems. One such condition is asthma where the stems have reportedly helped alleviate pain thus improving the overall condition of the patient. Although other known species of Ephedra do contain ephedrine, Ephedra nevadensis does not contain significant quantities of the stimulant. This being said, this particular species of Ephedra can be utilized domestic settings to treat mild health conditions and alleviate discomfort but would likely not have a major impact in clinical settings with current knowledge about its biochemical composition.
