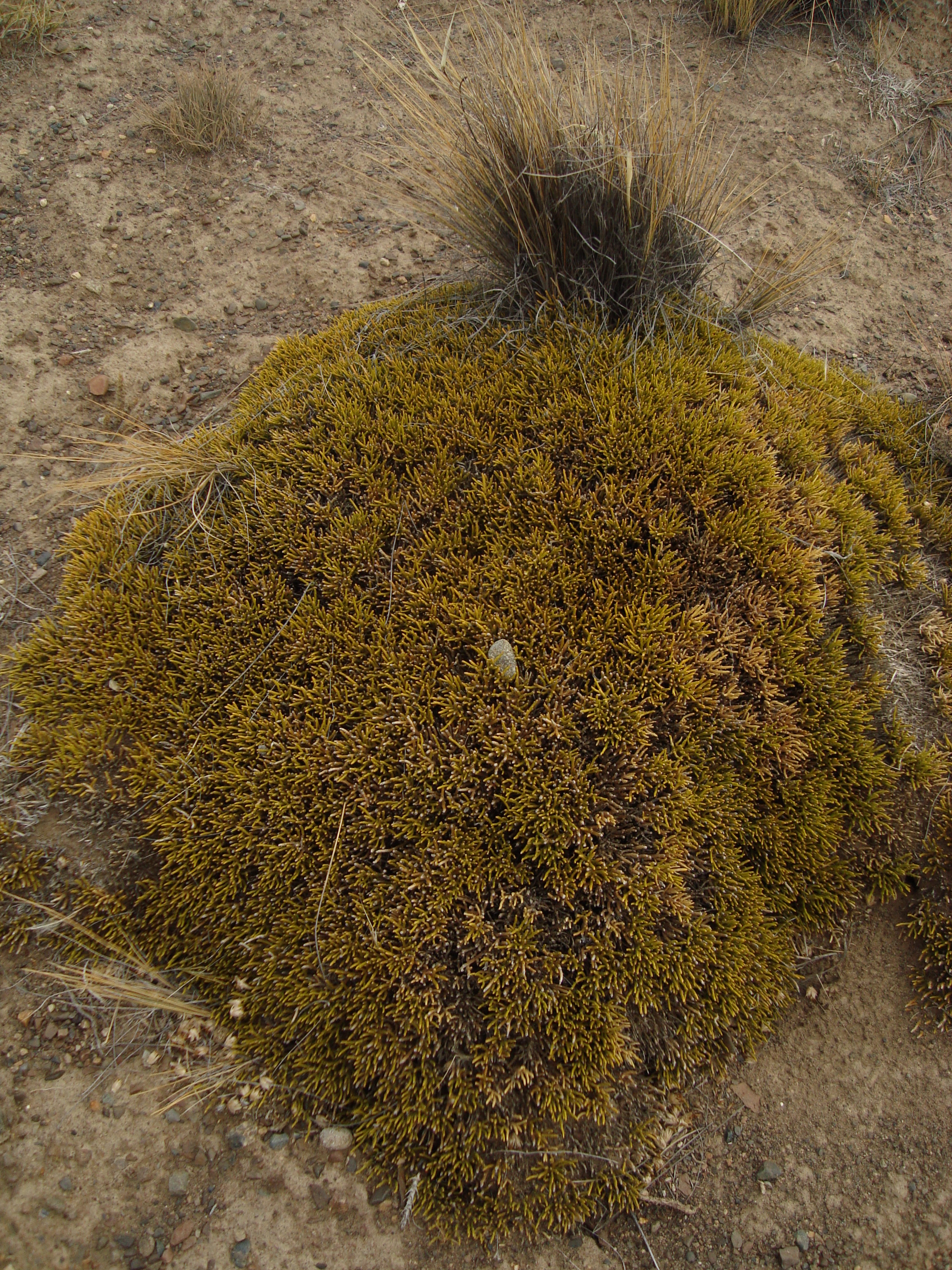

Conservation status
- Least Concern (IUCN 3.1)

Scientific classification
- Kingdom: Plantae
- Clade: Tracheophytes
- Clade: Gymnosperms
- Division: Pinophyta
- Class: Pinopsida
- Subclass: Gnetidae
- Order: Ephedrales
- Family: Ephedraceae
- Genus: Ephedra
- Species: E. frustillata

Binomial name
- Ephedra frustillata Miers

Synonyms
- Heterotypic Synonyms: Ephedra nana Dusén; Ephedra patagonica Phil.; Ephedra patagonica Phil. ex Stapf

= Ephedra frustillata =

Species of seed-bearing shrub

Ephedra frustillata is a species of flowering plant in the family Ephedraceae. It is sometimes referred to by the common name Patagonian ephedra. It is native to Patagonia in southern Argentina, as well as in central and southern Chile.

== Distribution and habitat ==
The shrub grows in arid areas in sandy soil, sand dunes or on rocks, in full sun and can grow up to one meter in height.

== Uses ==
Ephedra frustillata contains apigeninidin, a 3-deoxyanthocyanidin.
