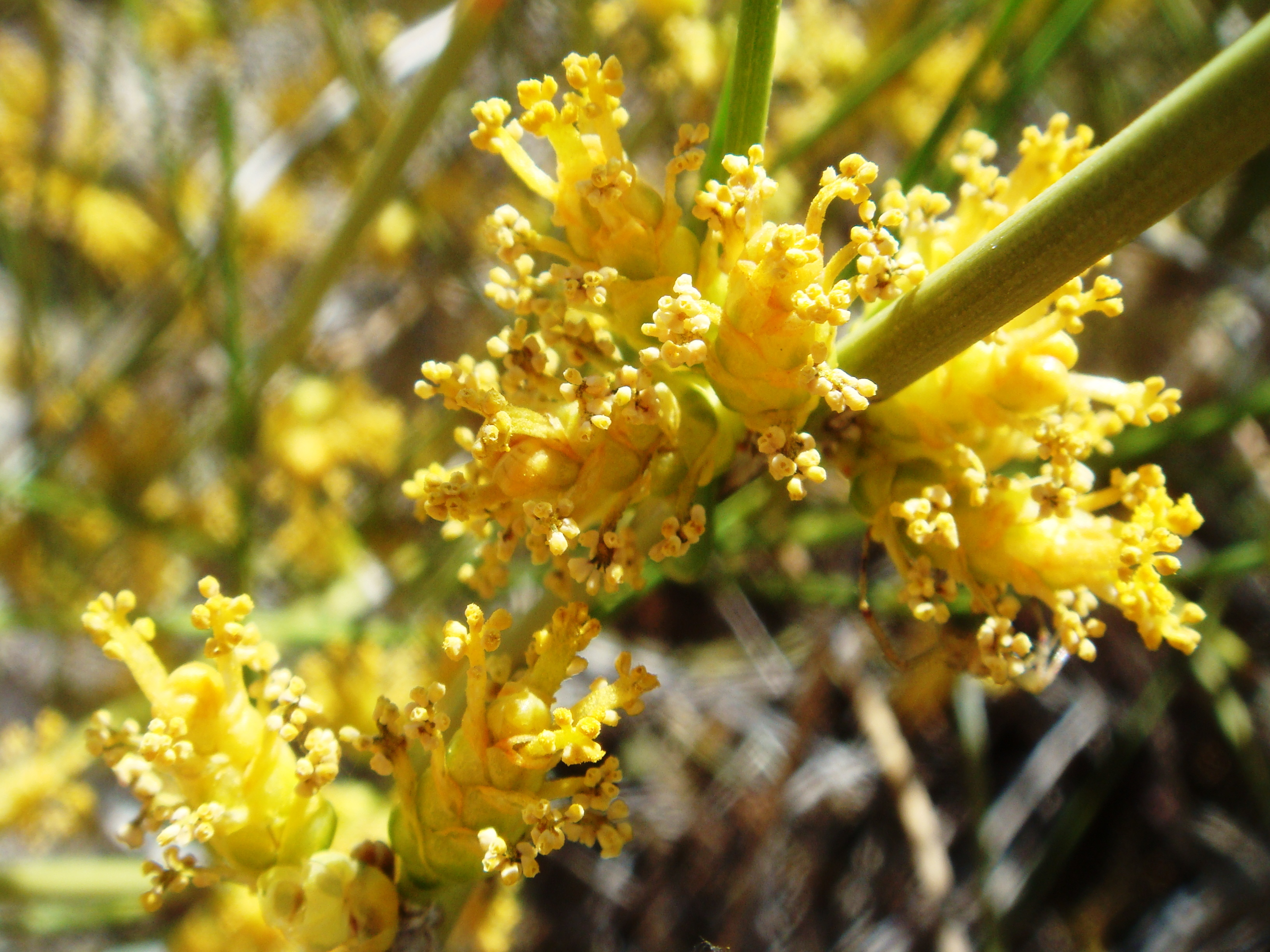

Conservation status
- Least Concern (IUCN 3.1)

Scientific classification
- Kingdom: Plantae
- Clade: Tracheophytes
- Clade: Gymnospermae
- Division: Gnetophyta
- Class: Gnetopsida
- Order: Ephedrales
- Family: Ephedraceae
- Genus: Ephedra
- Species: E. aspera

Binomial name
- Ephedra aspera Engelm. ex S.Wats.

Synonyms
- Ephedra nevadensis var. aspera (Engelm. ex S.Watson) L.D.Benson; Ephedra peninsularis I.M.Johnst.; Ephedra reedii Cory

= Ephedra aspera =

Species of seed-bearing shrub

Ephedra aspera is a species of Ephedra known by the common names rough jointfir, boundary ephedra, and pitamoreal. It is native to the southwestern United States from California to Texas and parts of northern Mexico as far south as Zacatecas. It is a resident of varied woodland and scrub plant communities.

== Description ==
Ephedra aspera is a highly branched shrub often exceeding 1 metre (3.3 ft) in height made up of many long yellow-gold twigs. Its small leaves are just a few millimeters long. Male plants bear pollen cones 4 to 7 millimeters long. Female plants may be darker to reddish in color, bearing seed cones which are slightly larger than those of the male plant and contain only one seed each.

Shrubs are 0.5–1.5 m in length. Bark is gray, cracked and fissured. Branches are opposite or whorled, rigid, angle of divergence is about 30°. Twigs are pale to dark green, becoming yellow with age, not viscid, slightly to strongly scabrous, with numerous longitudinal grooves; internodes are 1–6 cm in length. Terminal buds conic, 1–2 mm, apex obtuse. Leaves opposite (rarely in whorls of 3), 1–3(–5) mm, connate to 1/2–7/8 their length; bases thickened, brown, shredding with age, ± persistent; apex obtuse. Pollen cones 2 (rarely 1 or whorled) at node, obovoid, 4–7 mm, sessile or rarely on short peduncles; bracts opposite, 6–10 pairs, yellow to red-brown, obovate, 3–4 × 2–3 mm, membranous; bracteoles slightly exceeding bracts; sporangiophores 4–5 mm, 1/2 exserted, with 4–6 sessile to short-stalked (less than 1 mm) microsporangia. Seed cones usually 2 at node, ovoid, 6–10 mm, sessile or on short, scaly peduncles; bracts opposite, 5–7 pairs, circular, 4–7 × 2–4 mm, membranous, with red-brown thickened center and base, margins entire. Seed 1, ellipsoid, 5–8 × 2–4 mm, light brown to brown, smooth to slightly scabrous.
