= Robert Hibbs Peebles =

American botanist, explorer and agriculturist (1900–1956)

Robert H. Peebles
- Peebles in 1944
- Born: 1900
- Died: 1956 (aged 55)
- Known for: Research in cotton breeding, desert plant taxonomy
- Scientific career
- Fields: Botany, Agronomy
- Institutions: U.S. Department of Agriculture

Robert Hibbs Peebles (1900–1956) was an American botanist and agronomist who worked for the United States Department of Agriculture. He is known for his contributions to the flora of the American Southwest and work on breeding cotton. His 1951 book Arizona Flora, co-authored with Thomas H. Kearney, and republished posthumously in 1960, is recognized as the most comprehensive study of Arizona plants of its time.

Peebles named and described over 180 species or variety of plants, often in collaboration with Kearney. Peebles and Kearney also collaborated on cotton breeding, and their contributions to the science of cotton growing have been recognized as "among the most outstanding of all time." In 1955, Peebles was awarded an honorary Doctorate of Science from the University of Arizona in recognition of his contributions to Arizona agriculture.

Peebles died at the age of 55 in March 1956, the same year as Kearney. He was posthumously awarded the Superior Service award and medal by the USDA. The cactus Pediocactus peeblesianus is named in his honor.

== Selected works ==
- Kearney, T. H., and R. H. Peebles. 1927. "Inheritance of rate of shedding in a cotton hybrid". Journal of Agricultural Research. 34 (10): 921–926.
- Peebles, R. H., & Kearney, T. H. 1928. Mendelian inheritance of leaf shape in cotton. Journal of Heredity, 19(5), 235–238.
- Kearney, T. H., & Peebles, R. H. 1942. Flowering plants and ferns of Arizona (No. 423). US Dept. of Agriculture.
- Peebles, Robert H. 1942. Pure-seed production of Egyptian-type cotton. Washington, DC: US Dept. of Agriculture.
- Peebles, Robert H., G. T. Den Hartog, and E. H. Pressley. 1956. Effect of spacing on some agronomic and fiber characteristics of irrigated cotton. Washington: US Dept. of Agriculture.
- Kearney, T. H, and R. H. Peebles. 1960. Arizona Flora: with supplement by John Thomas Howell, Elizabeth McLintock and collaborators. Berkeley: Univ. of California Press.

== See also ==
- Arizona Native Plant Society
- List of Sonoran Desert wildflowers
