= Harald Udo von Riedl =

Austrian botanist and mycologist (born 1936)

Harald Udo von Riedl (born 1936) is an Austrian botanist and mycologist. A species in the Borrage family, Heliotropium riedlii, is named in his honour. His published work is as "Harald Riedl".
