= Otto Stapf (botanist) =

Austrian born botanist and taxonomist (1857–1933)

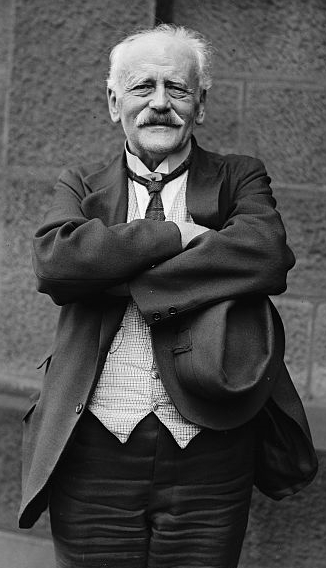
- Born: 23 March 1857; Perneck near Bad Ischl
- Died: 3 August 1933 (aged 76); Innsbruck
- Awards: Linnean Medal (1927); Fellow of the Royal Society
- Scientific career
- Institutions: Royal Botanic Gardens, Kew
- Author abbrev. (botany): Stapf

Otto Stapf FRS (23 April 1857 – 3 August 1933) was an Austrian born botanist and taxonomist, the son of Joseph Stapf, who worked in the Hallstatt salt-mines. He grew up in Hallstatt and later published about the archaeological plant remains from the Late Bronze- and Iron Age mines that had been uncovered by his father.

Stapf studied botany in Vienna under Julius Wiesner, where he received his PhD with a dissertation on cristals and cristalloids in plants. 1882 he became assistant professor (Assistent) of Anton Kerner. In 1887 he was made Privatdozent (lecturer without a chair) in Vienna. He published the results of an expedition Jakob Eduard Polak, the personal physician of Nasr al-Din, the Shah of Persia, had conducted in 1882, and plants collected by Felix von Luschan in Lycia and Mesopotamia 1881–1883. In 1885, Polak sponsored Stapf to conduct a botanical expedition of his own to South- and Western Persia, which was to last nine month. This led to the discovery of numerous new species, which Stapf started to publish. Including Iris meda.

After his return, Stapf was harassed by his boss, Anton Kerner, who voiced his disapproval of his travels. It was rumoured that Kerner wanted Stapf's job for Richard Wettstein, the new husband of his daughter Adele. He publicly accused him of wrong identifications of plants collected during the expedition.

In the end, Stapf moved to Royal Botanic Gardens, Kew in 1890. He was keeper of the Herbarium from 1909 to 1920 and became British citizen in 1905. He was awarded the Linnean Medal in 1927.

In May 1908 he was elected a Fellow of the Royal Society. His candidacy citation read:

Principal Assistant, Royal Botanic Gardens, Kew. He is at home in all branches of Scientific Botany, and is well known for the thoroughness of his work. His numerous publications have been chiefly in the field of Systematic Botany. Before coming to England, he spent nine months on a botanical exploration of Persia. His most important publications are: "Botan. Ergebnisse der Polak'schen Expedition nach Persien" (Memoirs of the Imperial Academy, Vienna, 1885–1886); "Beiträge zur Flora v Lycien, Carien u Mesopotamien" (ibid., 1885–1886); "Die Arten der Gattung Ephedra" (ibid., 1889); "Pedaliaceae and Martyniaceae" (Engler and Prantl's Die Natürlichen Pflanzenfamilien, 1895); "Flora of Mount Kinabalu in North Borneo" (Trans Linn Soc, 1894); "Melocanna bambusoides" (ibid., 1904); "Structure of Sararanga sinuosa" (Journ Linn Soc, 1896); "Dicellandra and Phaeoneuron" (ibid., 1900); "Monograph of the Indian Aconites" (Annals, Royal Botanic Garden, Calcutta, 1905). In Hooker's Icones Plantarum, about 100 plates with text, 1891–1905; part of "Gramineae" (Flora of British India, 1897); "Apocynaceae" (Flora of Tropical Africa, 1904); "Gramineae" (Flora Capensis, 1897–1900); "Lentibulariaceae" (ibid., 1904); "Pedaliaceae" (ibid., 1904).

He was also a member of the Austrian Academy of Sciences and the German botanical society.

== Works ==
Stapf wrote on the Graminae in William Turner Thiselton Dyer's edition of the Flora capensis (1898–1900).

== Other honours ==
In 1913 botanist Ernest Friedrich Gilg published Stapfiella, which is a genus of flowering plants from Tropical Africa belonging to the family Passifloraceae and named in his honour. Then in 2004, Hildemar Scholz published Stapfochloa, which is a genus of grasses from America and Africa.
