= Botanical identity of soma–haoma =

There has been much speculation as to the botanical identity of soma or haoma. Soma is a plant described in Hindu sacred texts including the Rigveda, while haoma is a plant described in the Avesta, a collection of Zoroastrian writings. Both names are derived from the Proto-Indo-Iranian *Sauma.

Soma/Haoma is considered to be a concoction of multiple ingredients instead of one plant, however the primary botanical plant and active ingredient is debated. In the past 250 years scholars have tried to identify this, with proposed candidates including various species of plants and or fungi. The leading scholarly consensus on the botanical identity of soma/haoma has been Ephedra (particularly Ephedra gerardiana, Ephedra intermedia, or Ephedra equisetina). Other theories currently endorse that soma/haoma was either fly-agaric mushrooms or Syrian rue. Furthermore, Ephedra has historically been the most purported due to being called som/hom/hum in South and Central Asian languages. Ephedra geradiana in particular was called Somalata (moon plant) in Sanskrit.

Researchers also suggest other plants with and without psychoactive properties, such as the perennial Peganum harmala, Nelumbo nucifera (also known as the "sacred lotus"), Cannabis sativa, the sugarcane species Tripidium bengalense (synonym Saccharum sara), the grass Phalaris aquatica, and the devil's-trumpet plant Datura metel. Fungal candidates include the fly-agaric mushroom Amanita muscaria, the psilocybin-containing mushroom Psilocybe cubensis, and the ergot fungus Claviceps purpurea. Soma/haoma has been described as being mixed with other substances (e.g. fermented mare's milk or fermented honey). Srauta Brahmins called Somayajis use Cynanchum acidum today.

== Background ==
=== Avesta ===
Since the late 18th-century, when Abraham Hyacinthe Anquetil-Duperron and others made portions of the Zoroastrian Avesta available to Western scholarship, several scholars have sought a representative botanical equivalent of the haoma as described in the texts and as used in living Zoroastrian practice. Most of the proposed identifications have drawn primarily upon either linguistic evidence, comparative pharmacology, or reflected ritual use, but not all three: rarely have all three sources of evidence been considered in conjunction. Such unbalanced approaches to the problem of identity have resulted usually in the speedy rejection of these poorly-substantiated theories.

=== Vedas ===
The Rigveda calls the plant soma, and gives it precedence above Indra and the other Gods calling soma "a God for Gods".

Based on "RV 8.48"., Soma has been generally assumed to be entheogenic. (Note, there are numerous similar references in the Vedas, e.g. "RV 9.4"., "RV 9.5"., "RV 9.8"., "RV 9.10"., "RV 9.42".) Some descriptions of soma are associated with tapas (heat, excitement, "energy"). Soma is associated with the warrior-god Indra, and appears to have been drunk before battle. For these reasons, there are stimulant (ephedrine-like) plants as well as entheogenic plants among the candidates that have been suggested. Soma is also often associated with light and Indra is the "Lord of Light" as shown in "RV 8.82.25".

For thee, O Lord of Light, are shed these Soma-drops, and grass is strewn. Bring Indra to his worshippers. May Indra give thee skill, and lights of heaven, wealth to his votary. And priests who praise him: laud ye him.

Texts like the Atharva Veda (and also texts of the Brahmana class) extol the medicinal properties of soma and it was regarded as the king of medicinal herbs.

=== Account of Swami Rama ===
In his autobiography, Swami Rama recalls contacting an Indian herbologist and Vedic scholar named Vaidya Bhairavdutt, who is described as "the only living authority on soma". Bhairavdutt comes to visit the swami, bringing about a pound of the herb with him. He informs the swami that though the plant's effects can be likened to that of psychedelic mushrooms, it is definitely not a mushroom, but rather a succulent plant. Bhairavdutt convinces the swami to join him in partaking the soma. The taste, says Swami Rama, is "a little bit bitter and sour." Bhairavdutt becomes inebriated and dances wildly, claiming he is Shiva. Several students attempt to restrain the apparently slightly built Bhairavdutt, but are unable to do so. Meanwhile, Swami Rama develops a crippling headache, a symptom which is compatible with the effects of high doses of ephedrine. No hallucinogenic effects are described by Swami Rama.

== Candidates for the identity of Soma/Haoma ==
=== Plants ===
==== Cynanchum acidum ====
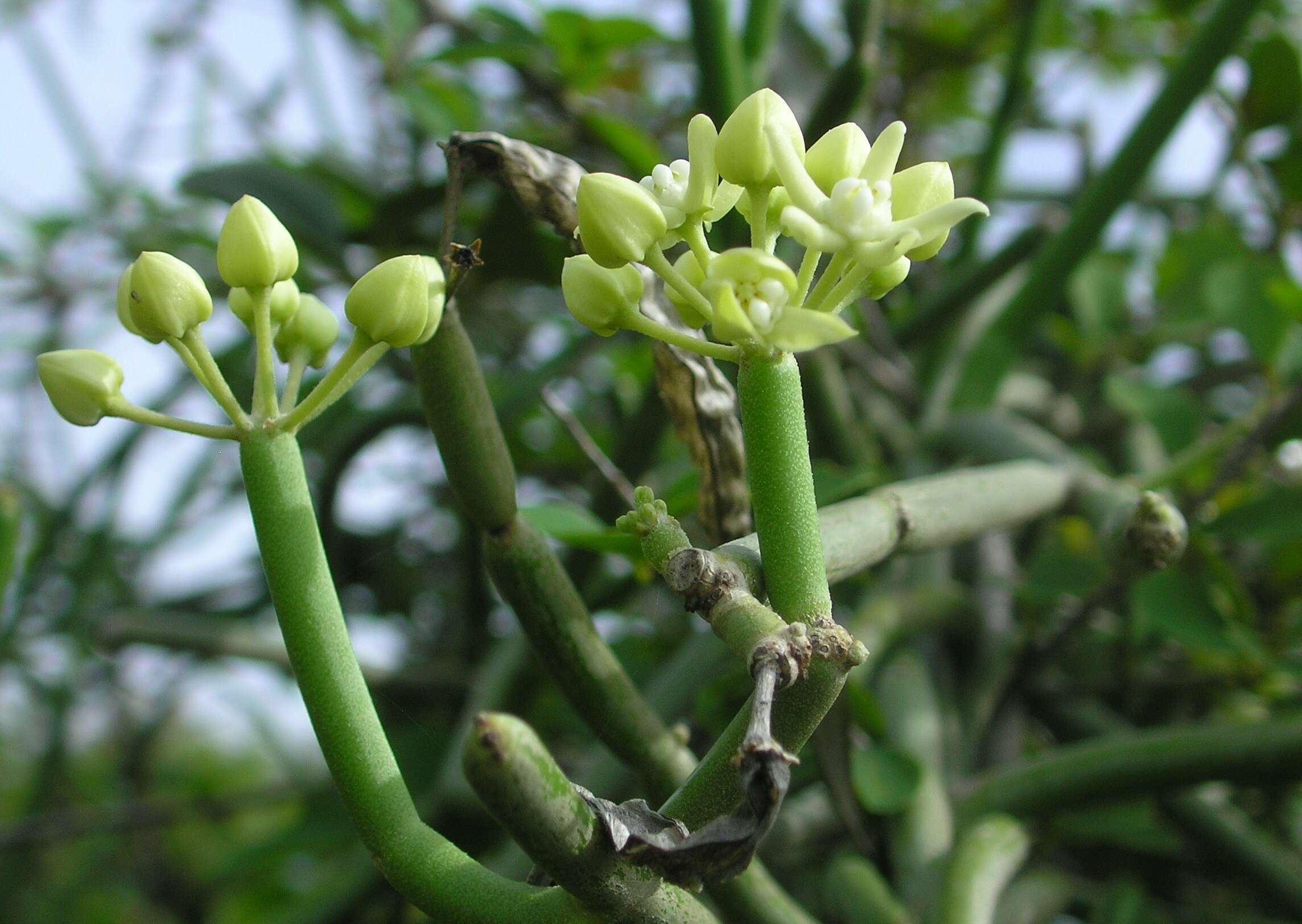
Cynanchum acidum, syn. Sarcostemma acidum, popularly known as the Somalata.

When Vedic rituals such as the somayaga are held today, traditionally in unbroken continuity in Southern India by Srauta Brahmins called Somayajis, the herb used is Somalata ('Moon creeper') Cynanchum acidum, a leafless plant that grows in arid places in peninsular India. This plant is known as the somalata (“soma plant”) in Ayurveda and Siddha medicine.

==== Ephedra ====
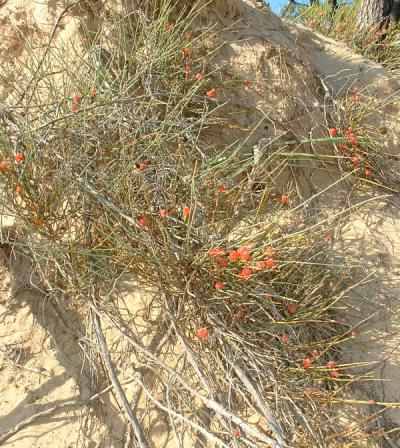
Ephedra distachya

A candidate favoured by proponents of the non-hallucinogenic / stimulant hypothesis is a species of Ephedra. Ephedrine, the principle active compound present in this plant, has a chemical structure similar to those of the amphetamines, and, when ingested, causes, among other effects, high blood-pressure. According to anecdotal reports, it also possesses a stimulating effect similar to that of caffeine.

In the late 19th century, the highly conservative Zoroastrians of Yazd province in Iran were found to be using Ephedra, (known locally known as hum or homa) which they were also exporting to their fellow Zoroastrians in India. The plant, as Falk also established, requires a cool (but not cold) and dry climate and thus will not grow in India (which is too hot and/or too humid) but will thrive in central Asia. Ephedra distachya is native to southern Europe and northern Asia. Later, it was discovered that a number of Iranian languages and Persian dialects have hom or similar terms as the local name for some variant of Ephedra.

Ephedra plants are shrubs, measuring between 0.2 and 4 meters, with numerous green or yellowish stems. There are about 30 species, mainly Eurasian. The species growing in mountainous regions have the highest ephedrine content (up to 3% in the case of Ephedra equisetina). The colour of the stem pith of certain Ephedra species is brown, recalling the Sanskrit epithet babhru ("greyish-brown"), used exclusively in the Vedas to describe the colour of the extract produced by pounding the stems of the soma plant.

The different species of Ephedra are not well known, and their taxonomy is in a state of confusion. Assuming a Pontic-Caspian home of Indo-Iranian religions (see Kurgan), the only likely candidate is E. distachya, still used in Iranian folk medicine.

The native name for Ephedra in most Indo-Iranian languages of Central Asia is derived from *sauma- (e.g. Nepali somalata, Pashto Oman/unan, Baluchi hum/huma/uma).

In 1989, in a highly influential text, Harry Falk pointed out that both the Flattery and Wasson arguments assumed that haoma was hallucinogenic, although the effect desired by Zoroastrian and Vedic ritual use was not. Falk noted that, in the texts, both haoma and soma were said to enhance alertness and awareness, did not coincide with the consciousness altering effects of an entheogen, and that "there is nothing shamanistic or visionary either in early Vedic or in Old Iranian texts,"} nor could the small doses administered in living Zoroastrian custom justify its consideration as an inebriant. Living custom also does not give the extract enough time to ferment, ruling out the possibility of any intoxicating effect dependent upon the presence of alcohol.

Falk established that the effect of the alkaloid ephedrine was, in many respects, similar to adrenaline, but "its actions are less intense but more prolonged than those of adrenaline, and, most important, it prevents sleeping." Chemically, ephedrine is similar to amphetamine (amphetamine itself originating as an innovative "upgrade" of an ephedrine prototypical base). Falk also asserted that the three varieties of ephedra that yield ephedrine (E. gerardiana, E. major procera and E. intermedia) also have the properties attributed to haoma by the texts of the Avesta.

In 1994, Viktor Sarianidi claimed that ancient ritual objects found at BMAC archeological sites in Central Asia bore traces of Ephedra stalks and Papaver (poppy) seeds. In 1995, Harri Nyberg investigated the specimens provided by Sarianidi but could not confirm the claim. (Note: Nyberg, Harri (1995). Erdosy, George (ed.). "The problem of the Aryans and the Soma: the botanical evidence". The Indo-Aryans of Ancient South-Asia: Language, Material Culture and Ethnicity: 382–406. cited by Houben (2003).) Another site provided material which Sarianidi had declared contained traces of Ephedra, Papaver, and Cannabis (hemp) in 1998–1999. It was analysed in 2002–2003 by three independent teams, but they found no traces of the claimed contents.

Nonetheless, in the conclusion of his observations on the 1999 haoma-soma workshop in Leiden, Jan E. M. Houben writes that "[d]espite strong attempts to do away with Ephedra by those who are eager to see *sauma as a hallucinogen, its status as a serious candidate for the Rigvedic soma and Avestan haoma still stands." This supports Falk, who in his summary noted that "there is no need to look for a plant other than Ephedra, the one plant used to this day by the Parsis".

==== Peganum harmala ====
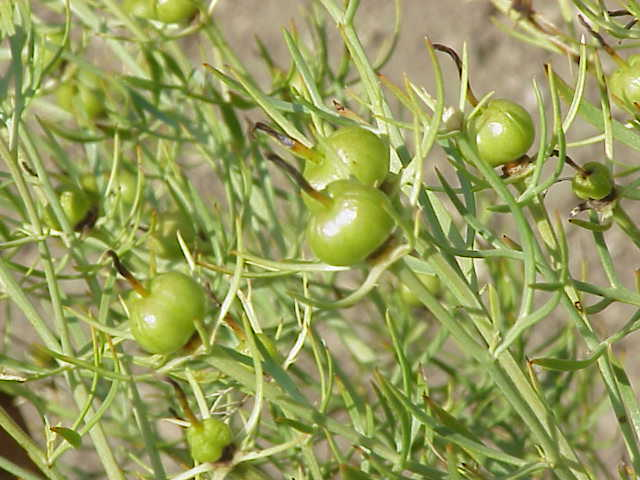
Seed capsules of Peganum harmala

In 1989, David Flattery, with linguistic support from Martin Schwarz, concentrated again on Iranian haoma. The two paid particular attention to the hallucinogenic properties that may be interpreted from the texts, and discounted Ephedra because they could not observe Zoroastrian priests becoming intoxicated. They concluded that it was "therefore neither likely that Ephedra was a substitute for *sauma nor that it was *sauma itself" and that the ephedrine and pseudoephedrine alkaloids extracted from Ephedra had to be mixed with the extract from some other plant to achieve the described effects. Flattery proposed the second plant was Peganum harmala (harmal, harmel, Syrian rue, see also harmaline), known in Iranian languages as esfand, sepand or other similar terms related to Avestan word spenta ('sacred', 'holy'). Flattery considered harmel to be the real haoma, with Ephedra only being the secondary ingredient in the parahaoma mixture.

Another factor involved in favouring Peganum harmala as the identity of soma-haoma is the use of plants with a similar chemistry (notably Banisteriopsis caapi) by certain South American cultures to prepare hallucinogenic drinks in which the plants' harmala alkaloids serve to potentiate the effects of other ingredients. The Iranian flora is not rich in true hallucinogenic species - P. harmala is the only incense plant with hallucinogenic properties in Iran and the only one which could activate normally inactive compounds present in certain other Iranian plants. Such Peganum-containing drinks could have furnished intoxicants compatible with the purported role of the drink described in the Indo-Iranian texts (as understood by proponents of the hallucinogen hypothesis).

Peganum harmala contains harmaline, which is a strong MAO-inhibitor, and it is therefore often used as a first component in modern practices modelled on ayahuasca ceremonies, in which (as with the Banisteriopsis component of the traditional South American drink) its alkaloids inhibit the metabolisation of an orally administered DMT molecule (2nd component). Since co-occurrence of DMT-bearing Phalaris grass and the MAOI-rich Peganum harmala has been observed at Yazd, Persepolis, Merv and Termez, the hypothesis stating that soma/haoma was a biochemical Eurasian correlate of ayahuasca cannot be excluded a priori.

==== Nelumbo nucifera ====
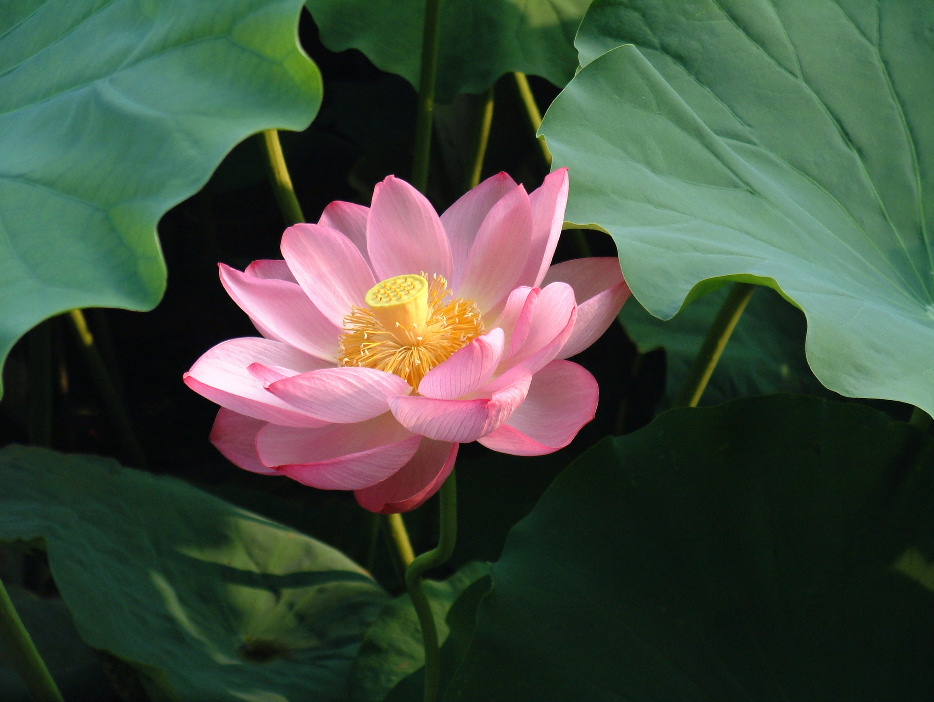
Nelumbo nucifera

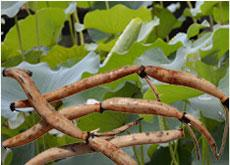
Re. Vedic description of Soma: "joint by joint, knot by knot" - jointed/knotted appearance of the rhizomes of the sacred lotus

Based on a detailed botanical analysis of iconography and ancient texts, Nelumbo nucifera, the 'sacred lotus', is another candidate for soma: the descriptions of soma in the Vedic texts can be construed as being reminiscent of the morphology of this much-venerated water plant, which has long featured prominently in the religious symbolism of the east. Nelumbo nucifera is a waterlily-like plant that produces golden-red flowers on long stalks arising from rootstocks anchored in the mud of lake bottoms. The appearance of its flower recalls certain metaphors employed in the ancient texts which compare soma to an arrow and to the sun. Certain Vedic hymns describe soma as having a "ruddy radiance" - referable possibly to the colour of the flowers of Nelumbo nucifera. Soma is also described in the Vedic hymns as growing "joint by joint, knot by knot" - a good description of a plant that grows by producing procumbent shoots with nodes and internodes. In addition, benzoisoquinoline alkaloids found in Nelumbo nucifera, including aporphine, proaporphine, and nuciferine, are psychoactive, producing feelings of euphoria when ingested.

==== Cannabis sativa ====
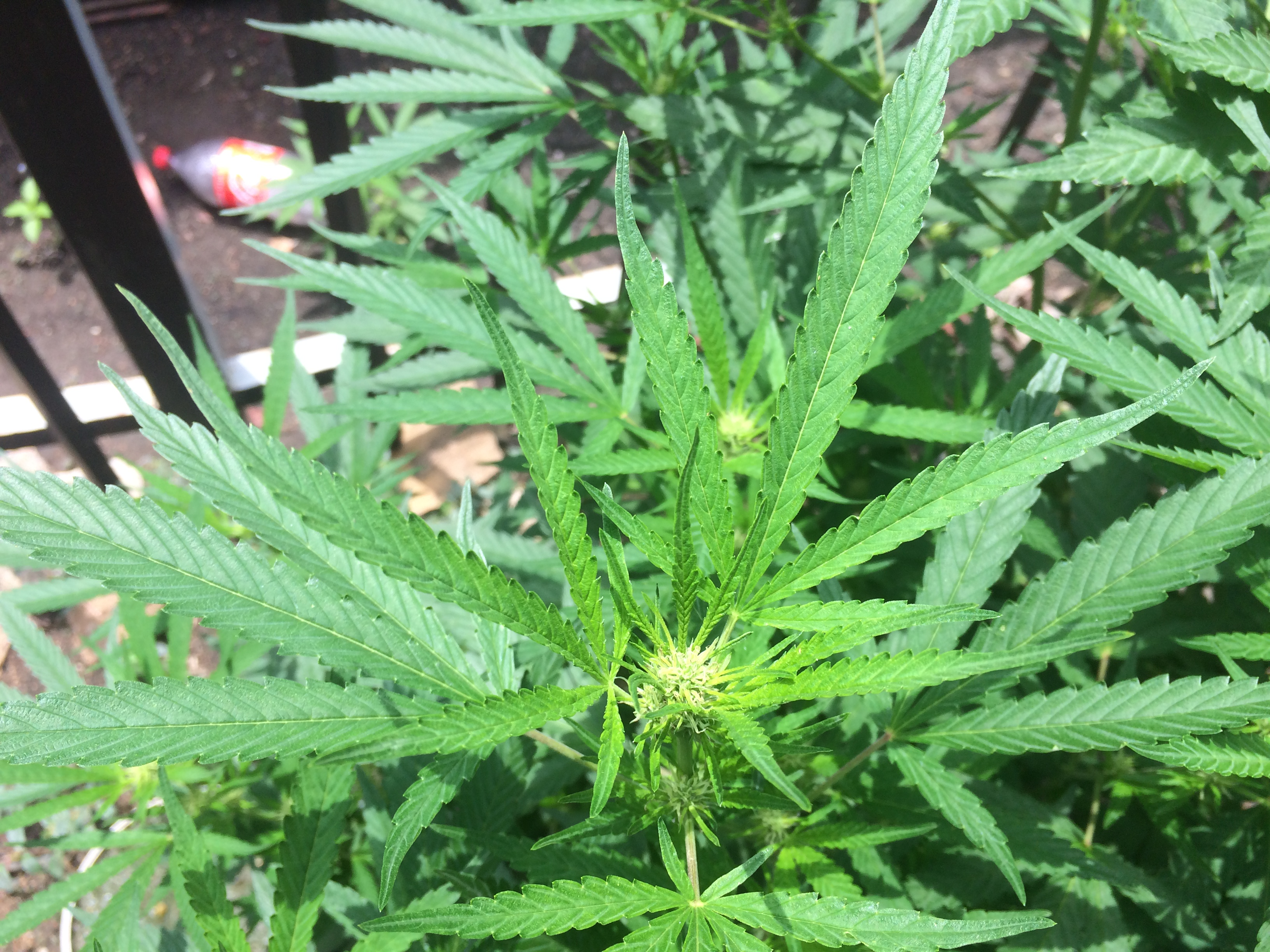
A female sativa cannabis strain in flowering or “budding” stage.

Some believe that cannabis is one possible candidate for soma. Jogesh Chandra Ray claims that the method of preparation of soma and bhang (an edible preparation of Cannabis) are similar and the described effects of soma and bhang are also similar. He also claims that the habitat of the soma plant and Cannabis plant are similar and that they originate from the north west Himalayan region. Chris Bennett, in his book Cannabis and the Soma Solution, likewise draws parallels and similarities between soma and cannabis.

Excavations at the Margiana temples have revealed the remains of a process used for making a drink similar to soma-haoma. This may constitute archeological evidence supporting the process for producing soma attested in the Avesta and the Rigveda. In the temples found, the central position is occupied by what have been dubbed "white rooms", along the walls of which are sunk, into side platforms, vessels carved from thick layers of gypsum. These basins have yielded dried residues derived from drinks containing infusions of the psychoactive plants ephedra, cannabis and (opium) poppy. Scholars such as Victor Sarianidi state that this proves that soma was made from a combination of poppy, cannabis and ephedra. Other scholars support Sarianidi's claims.

Some scholars, such as Mia Touw, have suggested that the Chinese name for cannabis, huǒ-má (火麻 lit. 'fiery hemp'), which was also called hú-má (胡麻 lit. 'barbarian hemp') meaning "Scythian hemp" or "Iranian hemp", was a phonosemantic borrowing from a Central Asian language, possibly a cognate of the Avestan word Haoma, lending some etymological evidence to the hypothesis that identifies cannabis as soma.

==== Sugarcane ====
Several authors have identified Tripidium bengalense (synonym Saccharum sara), a variety of sugarcane that grows near lakes as source of Vedic soma or with an ancient variety of sugarcane that may presently be extinct.

==== Other, less-popular candidates ====
- Papaver somniferum
- Argyreia nervosa
- Periploca aphylla
- Cynanchum viminale, syn. Sarcostemma viminale

=== Fungi ===
==== Fly-agaric ====
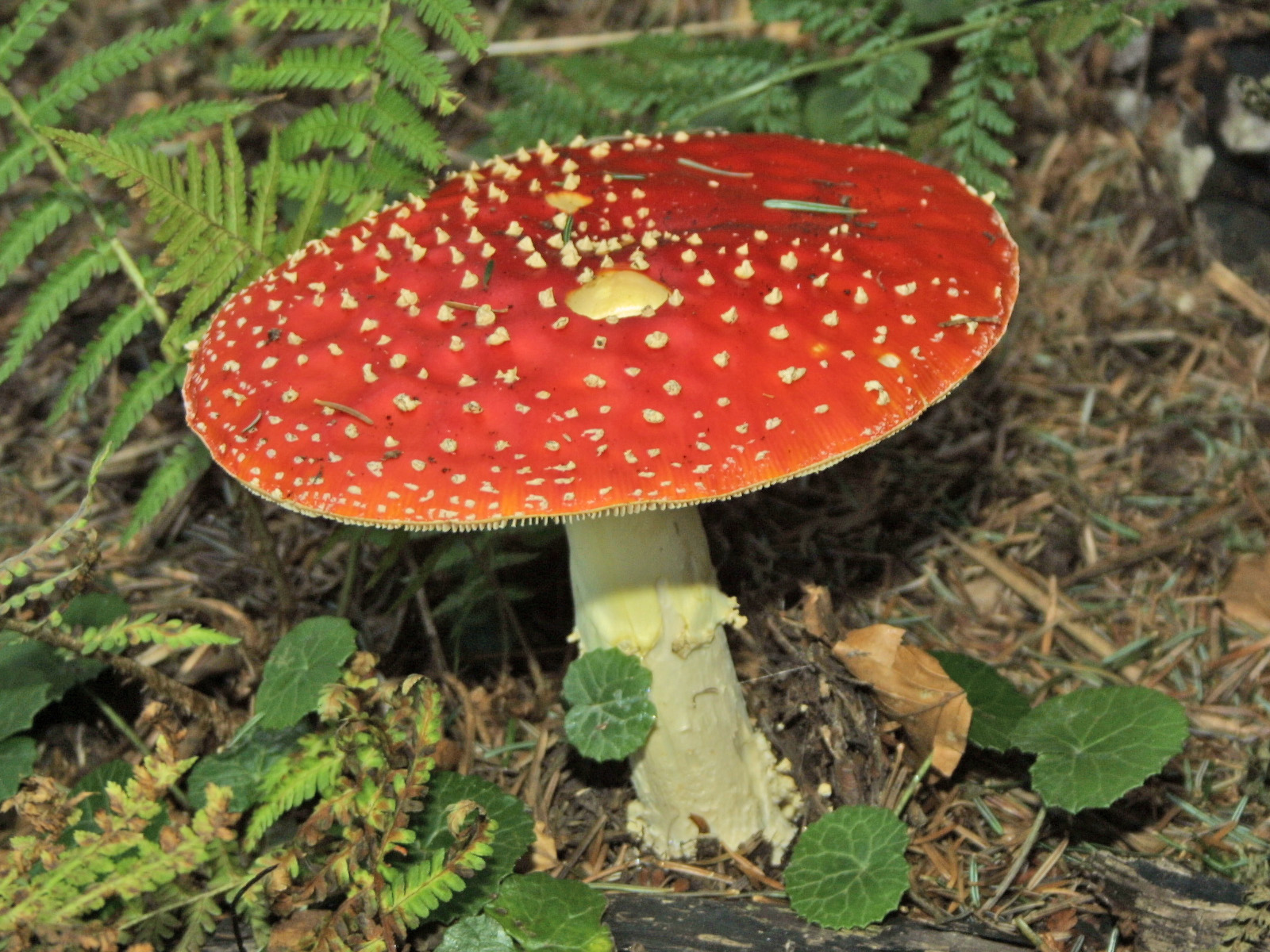
Fly-agaric (Amanita muscaria).

From the late 1960s onwards, several studies attempted to establish soma as a psychotropic substance. A number of proposals were made, including an important one in 1968 by Robert Gordon Wasson, an amateur mycologist, who (on Vedic evidence) asserted that soma was an inebriant, and suggested fly-agaric mushroom, Amanita muscaria, as the likely candidate. Wasson and his co-author, Wendy Doniger O'Flaherty, drew parallels between Vedic descriptions and reports of Siberian uses of the fly-agaric in shamanic ritual. Furthermore, the mountainous origin of soma matches the habitat of fly-agaric, and when discussing soma, the Vedas do not mention any part of a flowering tree.

In 1971, Vedic scholar John Brough from Cambridge University rejected Wasson's theory and drew attention to ephedrine (in particular to that extracted from Ephedra sinica), and noted that it "is a powerful stimulant, and would thus be a more plausible preparation for warriors about to go into battle than the fly-agaric, which is a depressant." (for use of parahaoma by soldiers, see reference to the Ab-Zohr in Denkard 8.25.24). This was in turn contradicted in 1974 by Iranologist Ilya Greshevitch, who determined that, in small doses, fly-agaric was indeed a stimulant. In any case, since the "weapon" that Indra uses is the Vajra which emits "lightning bolts", the "battles" could not have been physical ones.

J. P. Mallory rejects Wasson's argument that the absence of Vedic descriptions of plant parts point to a fungus, since the Vedas do not describe in other than metaphorical detail the plant from which the soma drink was extracted. He further explains the references to mountains as a metaphor "recalling soma's lofty origins".

Kevin Feeney and Trent Austin compared the references in the Vedas with the filtering mechanisms in the preparation of Amanita muscaria and published findings supporting the proposal that fly-agaric mushrooms could be a likely candidate for the sacrament.

Said Gholam Mochtar and Hartmut Geerken published their findings regarding the medicinal and recreational use of A. muscaria among the Parachi-speaking inhabitants of the Shutul Valley in the Hindu Kush range of Afghanistan. [See below].

==== Psilocybe cubensis ====
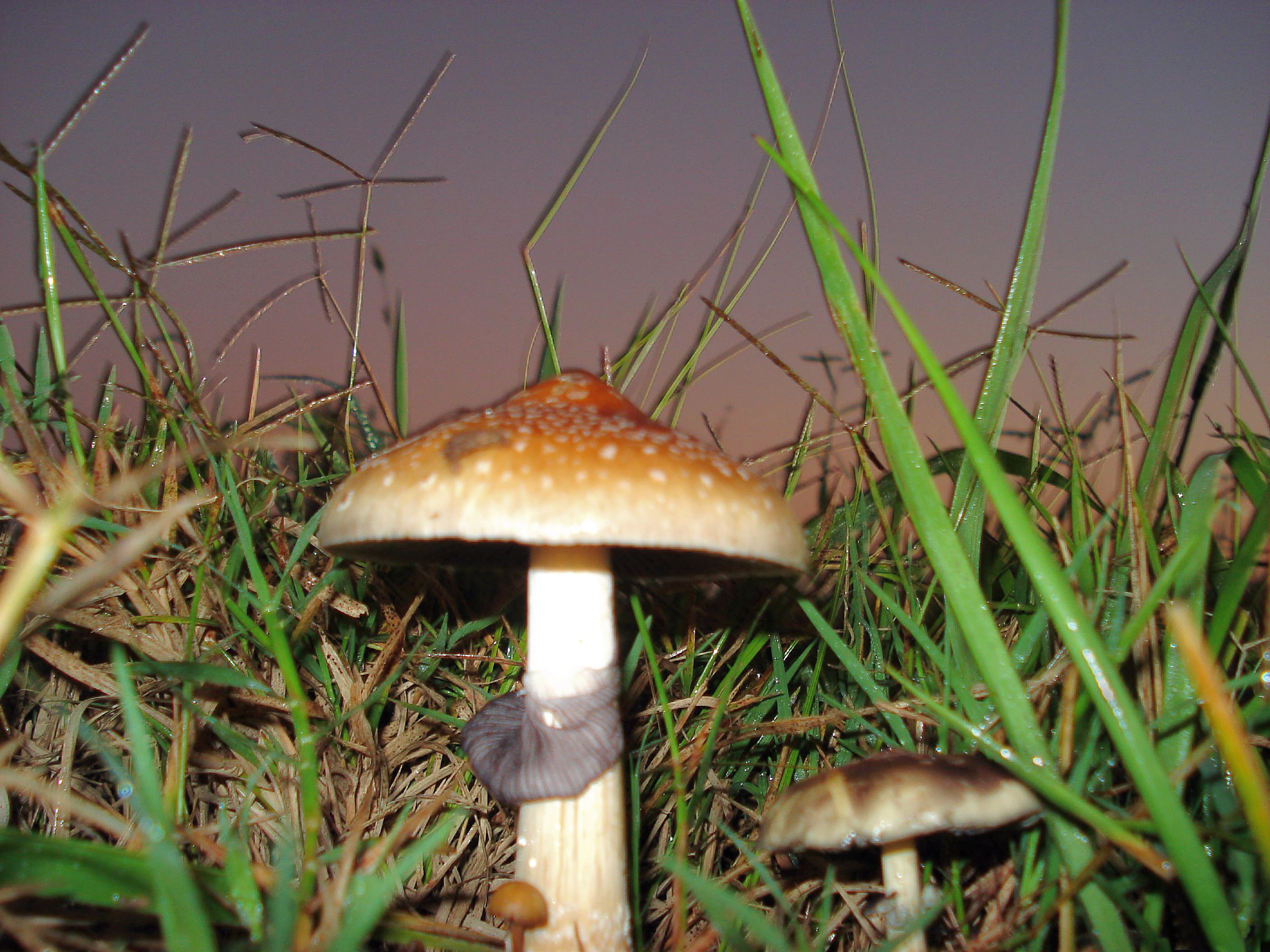
Psilocybe cubensis mushroom

In his book Food of the Gods, Terence McKenna criticizes the Amanita muscaria theory and suggests the psilocybin-containing Psilocybe cubensis mushroom as a soma candidate. McKenna argues that effects of the A. muscaria mushrooms contradict the description of the properties described in the Rigveda. Mushrooms of A. muscaria have properties that are arguably more deliriant than psychedelic. Psilocybin, the active psychoactive component in P. cubensis, has a strong mind-altering effect. McKenna cites other cultures who use and venerate psychedelic plant-drugs in religious ceremonies such as at Chavin de Huantar, Peru.

Gordon Wasson, who initially suggested that the soma plant was A. muscaria, described Psilocybe cubensis as "easily identified and gathered" in India, and eventually hypothesized, along with McKenna, that P. cubensis was perhaps the true identity of soma. McKenna and Wasson both unsuccessfully attempted to use A. muscaria to achieve a state of consciousness conducive to the development of a religion.

The 9th mandala of the Rigveda suggests that the cow is the embodiment of soma, which provides support for McKenna's theory because P. cubensis is known to grow in cow dung.

An ancient rug discovered in the year 2010 depicts figures conjectured to be those of kings, priests, and/or even warriors - one of whom is holding an object strongly resembling a mushroom with a large cap. The context has been interpreted as an offering forming part of a Haoma ritual performed next to fire.

==== The Mushroom of the Noin-Ula rug and a Persian entheogen ====
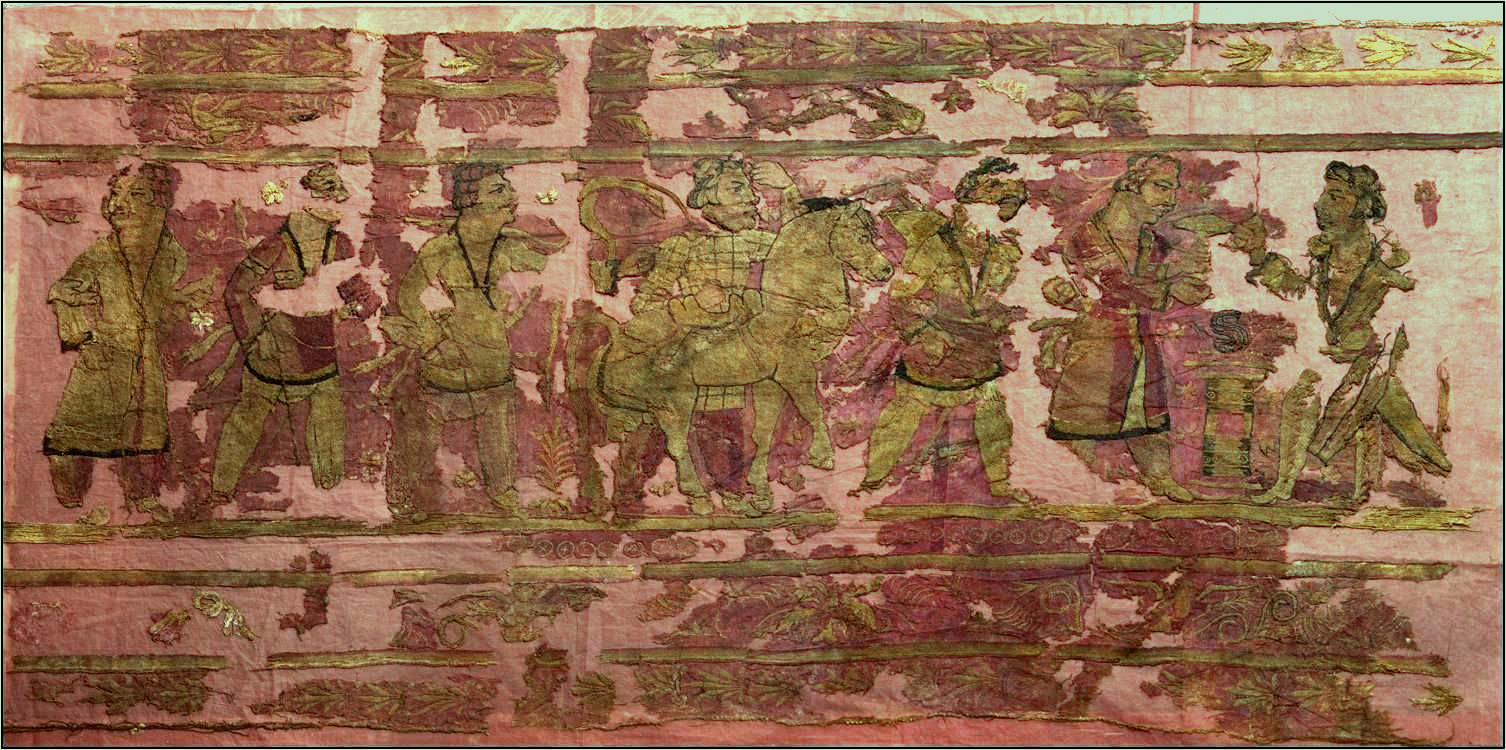
Embroidered rug depicting haoma ritual discovered at the Noin-Ula burial site: note individual second from right holding large mushroom over fire altar

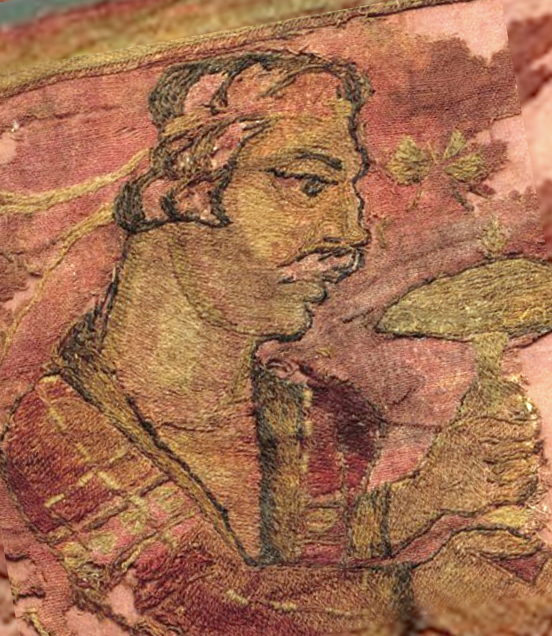
Detail of individual depicted holding mushroom over fire altar on Noin-Ula rug: note semi-circles at edge of mushroom cap intended probably to show spots either of Psilocybe cubensis cap or Amanita muscaria cap (although impossible to identify mushroom species for certain)

In the context of a possible fungal identity for haoma, some remarkable evidence has been found in the iconography employed in an ancient, embroidered rug discovered in the year 2010 in a Xiongnu burial chamber in Mongolia's Noin-Ula burial site. This depicts figures conjectured to be those of kings, priests, and/or warriors - one of whom is holding an object strongly resembling a large mushroom with a broad, scalloped (or spotted) cap and a bulbous base - this within the context of what appears to an offering forming part of a haoma ritual performed next to a fire altar (see also Atar). The embroidery is not only of a high quality, but also exhibits a remarkable degree of preservation, permitting detailed analysis of facial features, costume and ritual paraphernalia - even allowing the dating of the artifact to within fifty years on either side of the turn of the Common Era. The authors offer a tentative identification of the mushroom depicted in the ritual as Psilocybe cubensis, although they reference also Amanita muscaria, while casting doubt upon the suitability of the chemistry of the latter species for inducing ecstasies of the type evoked by haoma.

The time-worn cloth found on the floor covered with blue clay of the Xiongnu burial chamber and brought back to life by restorers has a long and complicated story. It was made someplace in Syria or Palestine, embroidered, probably, in north-western India and found in Mongolia...The manner in which the warrior with a horse is depicted copies in minute detail the images on the heads of the coins minted by Indo-Scythian (Saka) kings: Azes I, Aziles (typo for Azilises q.v.) and Azes II, who governed north-western India approximately from 57 BC, as well as by their successor Gondofar, the first Indo-Parthian ruler of West and East Punjab (from 20 AD to 46 AD)...These similarities are an important argument in favor of the hypothesis that the carpet shows Indo-Scythians or Indo-Parthians.

Some ethnomycological evidence, relevant to a tentative identification of the mushroom depicted in the Noin-Ula rug, may be found in an article published in 1979 by Said Gholam Mochtar and Hartmut Geerken in which the authors describe a tradition involving the medicinal and recreational use of Amanita muscaria among a Parachi-speaking group living in the remote Shutul Valley of the Panjshir Province of Afghanistan. Mochtar and Geerken's research, while intriguing, has not yet been corroborated by other investigators (an unsurprising state of affairs in view of a history of conflict in Afghanistan rendering scholarly fieldwork difficult, if not impossible). This said, if their conclusions are correct and Shutuli amanita use is a practice of some antiquity, this would place a tradition featuring ritual use of the fly agaric in the area in which the Noin-Ula embroidery was created (i.e. in a region abutting the northwest frontier of India) and in which a haoma-using Zoroastrian milieu would be historically plausible, given the Indo-Scythian provenance of the clothing depicted and the portrayal of a fire altar. Regarding the ability of A. muscaria to evoke transcendent states of consciousness comparable to those evoked by Soma/Haoma, it may be noted that the Shutuli refer to their mushroom by the Parachi name Chashm baskhon (= "the opener of the eye").

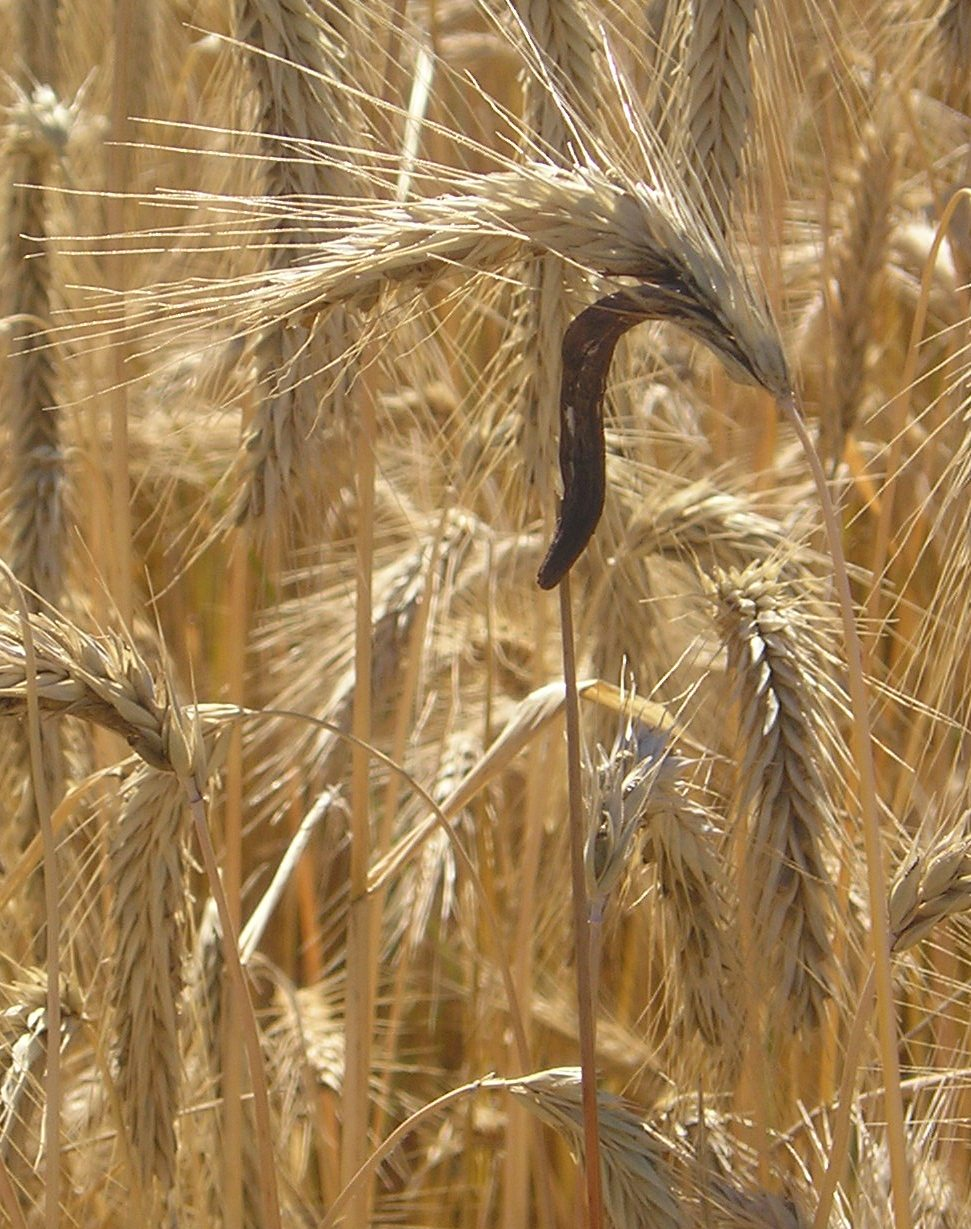
Claviceps purpurea

==== Ergot ====
In The Road to Eleusis, the authors, R. Gordon Wasson, Albert Hofmann, and Carl A. P. Ruck, note the similarity in preparation of the Vedic soma and the Kykeon of the Eleusinian Mysteries. The book hypothesizes that the source of both was ergot (Claviceps purpurea).

== Sources ==
- Falk, Harry (1989). "Soma I and II". Bulletin of the School of Oriental and African Studies. 52/1 (1): 77–90. doi:10.1017/S0041977X00023077. JSTOR 617914. S2CID 146512196.
- Hofmann, R.; Wasson, Gordon; Hofmann, Albert; Ruck, Carl A.P. (2008). The Road to Eleusis: Unveiling the secret of the mysteries. preface by Huston Smith; afterword by Albert Hofmann (30th anniversary ed.). Berkeley: North Atlantic Books. p. 91. ISBN 978-1-55643-752-6.
- Jay, Mike (1999). Blue Tide: The search for soma. Autonomedia.
- McKenna, Terence (1992). Food of the Gods: The search for the original tree of knowledge. New York: Bantam Books. ISBN 9780553078688. "A radical history of plants, drugs, and human evolution"
- Taillieu, Dieter (2002). "Haoma". Encyclopaedia Iranica. New York: Mazda Pub. Archived from the original on 29 June 2006.
- Taillieu, Dieter (1995). "Old Iranian haoma: A note on its pharmacology". Acta Belgica. 9.
- Vincent, Louis-Claude (1969). Le paradis perdu de Mu. Editions de la source – via Google Books.
- Wasson, Robert Gordon (1968). Soma: Divine mushroom of immortality. Ethno-Mycological Studies. Vol. 1. New York. ISBN 0-15-683800-1.
