= Soma (drink) =

Vedic ritual drink

Soma (Sanskrit: सोम, romanized: soma) is a ritual drink of importance in the Historical Vedic religion of the early Vedic Indo-Aryans. The Rigveda mentions it, particularly in the Soma Mandala. It is equivalent to the Iranian haoma, and associated with immortality (amrita) and the conquering of territory by a king.

The texts describe the preparation of soma by means of extracting the juice from a plant, the identity of which is now unknown and debated among scholars. There has been much speculation about the most likely identity of the original plant, with Ephedra gerardiana being the most likely candidate, (Note: Clark (2019): "The leading scholarly consensus on the botanical identity of soma/haoma is that it was (and still is) ephedra (Staal, 2008, p. 100). Boyce (2012), Falk (1989, 2002–2003), Madhihassan (1987), Nyberg (1997), Qazilbash (1960) have presented cogent arguments in favor of ephedra.) which was used in the late 19th century by the Zoroastrians of Yazd (Iran) (Note: Clark (2019): "It was discovered in the 19th century that ephedra is also used by Zoroastrians of Yazd in Iran (O’Flaherty, 1969, pp. 118, 122).") and is "used to this day by the Parsis".

== Etymology ==
Soma is a Vedic Sanskrit word that literally means "distill, extract, sprinkle", often connected in the context of rituals.

Soma's Avestan cognate is the haoma. According to Geldner (1951), the word is derived from Indo-Iranian roots *sav- (Sanskrit sav-/su) "to press", i.e. *sau-ma- is the drink prepared by pressing the stalks of a plant, but the word and the related practices were borrowed by the Indo-Aryans from the Bactria–Margiana culture (BMAC). Although the word is only attested in Indo-Iranian traditions, Manfred Mayrhofer has proposed a Proto-Indo-European origin from the root *sew(h)-.

Monier-Williams says it comes from Sanskrit su, meaning to press out or extract.

In the Rigveda, amrita, the elixir of immortality, is one of several synonyms for soma, which is the drink of the devas.

== Origins and textual references ==
=== Vedic religion ===
The Vedic religion was the religion of some of the Vedic Indo-Aryan tribes, the aryas, who migrated into the Indus River valley region of the Indian subcontinent. The Indo-Aryans were speakers of a branch of the Indo-Iranian language family, which originated in the Sintashta culture and further developed into the Andronovo culture, which in turn developed out of the Kurgan culture of the Central Asian steppes. The Vedic beliefs and practices of the pre-classical era were closely related to the hypothesised Proto-Indo-European religion, (Note: See Kuzʹmina (2007), The Origin of the Indo-Iranians, p. 339, for an overview of publications up to 1997 on this subject.) and show relations with rituals from the Andronovo culture, from which the Indo-Aryan people descended. According to Anthony, the Old Indic religion probably emerged among Indo-European immigrants in the contact zone between the Zeravshan River (present-day Uzbekistan) and (present-day) Iran. It was "a syncretic mixture of old Central Asian and new Indo-European elements" which borrowed "distinctive religious beliefs and practices" from the Bactria–Margiana culture (BMAC). This syncretic influence is supported by at least 383 non-Indo-European words that were borrowed from this culture, including the god Indra and the ritual drink Soma.

=== Vedic soma ===
The god Indra and the ritual drink Soma were adopted by the Indo-Aryans from the Bactria–Margiana culture (BMAC) and incorporated into the Vedic religion. According to Anthony,

Many of the qualities of Indo-Iranian god of might/victory, Verethraghna, were transferred to the adopted god Indra, who became the central deity of the developing Old Indic culture. Indra was the subject of 250 hymns, a quarter of the Rig Veda. He was associated more than any other deity with Soma, a stimulant drug (perhaps derived from Ephedra) probably borrowed from the BMAC religion. His rise to prominence was a peculiar trait of the Old Indic speakers.

In the Vedas, the same word (soma) is used for the drink, the plant, and its deity. Drinking soma produces immortality (Amrita, Rigveda 8.48.3). Indra and Agni are portrayed as consuming soma in copious quantities. In the vedic ideology, Indra drank large amounts of soma while fighting the serpent demon Vritra. The consumption of soma by human beings is well attested in Vedic ritual. The Soma Mandala of the Rigveda is completely dedicated to Soma Pavamana, and is focused on a moment in the ritual when the soma is pressed, strained, mixed with water and milk, and poured into containers.

These actions are described as a representation of a variety of things, including a king conquering territory, the Sun's journey through the cosmos, or a bull running to mate with cows (represented by the milk). The most important myth about Soma is about his theft. In it, Soma was originally held captive in a citadel in heaven by the archer Kṛśānu. A falcon stole Soma, successfully escaping Kṛśānu, and delivered Soma to Manu, the first sacrificer. Additionally, Soma is associated with the moon in the late Rigveda and Middle Vedic period. Sūryā, the daughter of the Sun, is sometimes stated to be the wife of Soma.

In the Vedas, soma "is both a plant and a god." The Rigveda (8.48.3) says:

We have drunk the soma; we have become immortal; we have gone to the light; we have found the gods.
What can hostility do to us now, and what the malice of a mortal, o immortal one? (Note: ápāma sómam amŕ̥tā abhūma áganma jyótir ávidāma devā́n kíṃ nūnám asmā́n kr̥ṇavad árātiḥ kím u dhūrtír amr̥ta mártiyasya)

=== Avestan haoma ===
The finishing of haoma in Zoroastrianism may be glimpsed from the Avesta (particularly in the Hōm Yast, Yasna 9), and Avestan language *hauma also survived as Middle Persian hōm. The plant haoma yielded the essential ingredient for the ritual drink, parahaoma.

In Yasna 9.22, haoma grants "speed and strength to warriors, excellent and righteous sons to those giving birth, spiritual power and knowledge to those who apply themselves to the study of the nasks". As the religion's chief cult divinity he came to be perceived as its divine priest. In Yasna 9.26, Ahura Mazda is said to have invested him with the sacred girdle, and in Yasna 10.89, to have installed haoma as the "swiftly sacrificing zaotar" (Sanskrit hotar) for himself and the Amesha Spenta.

=== Post-Vedic mentions ===
Soma has been mentioned in Chapter 9, verse 20 of Bhagavad Gita:

Those who perform actions (as described in the three Vedas), desiring fruit from these actions, and those who drink the juice of the pure Soma plant, are cleansed and purified of their past sins.
Those who desire heaven, (the Abode of the Lord known as Indraloka) attain heaven and enjoy its divine pleasures by worshipping me through the offering of sacrifices.
Thus, by performing good action (Karma, as outlined by the three Vedas), one will always undoubtedly receive a place in heaven where they will enjoy all of the divine pleasure that are enjoyed by the Deities. (Note: trai-vidyā māṁ soma-pāḥ pūta-pāpā yajñair iṣhṭvā svar-gatiṁ prārthayante te puṇyam āsādya surendra-lokam aśhnanti divyān divi deva-bhogān)

The Maharishi Mahesh Yogi's Transcendental Meditation-Sidhi Program involves a notion of "soma", said to be based on the Rigveda.

== Candidates for the plant ==
There have been numerous proposals and arguments as to the original Sauma plant. The most likely candidate is ephedra, but other possibilities that have been suggested include fermented honey, psychoactive mushrooms, and other herbal plants.

Likewise, since the late 18th century, when Abraham Hyacinthe Anquetil-Duperron and others made portions of the Avesta available to western scholars, several scholars have sought a representative botanical equivalent of the haoma as described in the texts and as used in living Zoroastrian practice.

=== Psycho-active substances ===
During the colonial British era scholarship, cannabis was proposed as the soma candidate by Jogesh Chandra Ray. and by B. L. Mukherjee (1921).

In the late 1960s, several studies attempted to establish soma as a psychoactive substance. A number of proposals were made, including one in 1968 by the American banker R. Gordon Wasson, an amateur ethnomycologist, who asserted that soma was an inebriant but not cannabis, and suggested fly-agaric mushroom, Amanita muscaria, as the likely candidate. Since its introduction in 1968, this theory has gained both detractors and followers in the anthropological literature. Wasson and his co-author, Wendy Doniger O'Flaherty, drew parallels between Vedic descriptions and reports of Siberian uses of the fly-agaric in shamanic ritual. In Food of The Gods, Terence McKenna maintained that Soma, at least or in whole part, was a product of Psilocybe cubensis.

Mark Merlin, who revisited the subject of the identity of soma more than thirty years after originally writing about it stated that there is a need of further study on links between soma and Papaver somniferum.

The Soviet archeologist Viktor Sarianidi wrote that he had discovered vessels and mortars used to prepare soma in Zoroastrian temples in the Bactria–Margiana Archaeological Complex. He said that the vessels have revealed residues and seed impressions left behind during the preparation of soma. This has not been sustained by subsequent investigations.

When the ritual of somayajna is held today in South India by the traditional Srautas called Somayajis, the plant used is the somalatha (Sanskrit: soma creeper, Sarcostemma acidum) which is procured as a leafless vine.

=== Ephedra ===
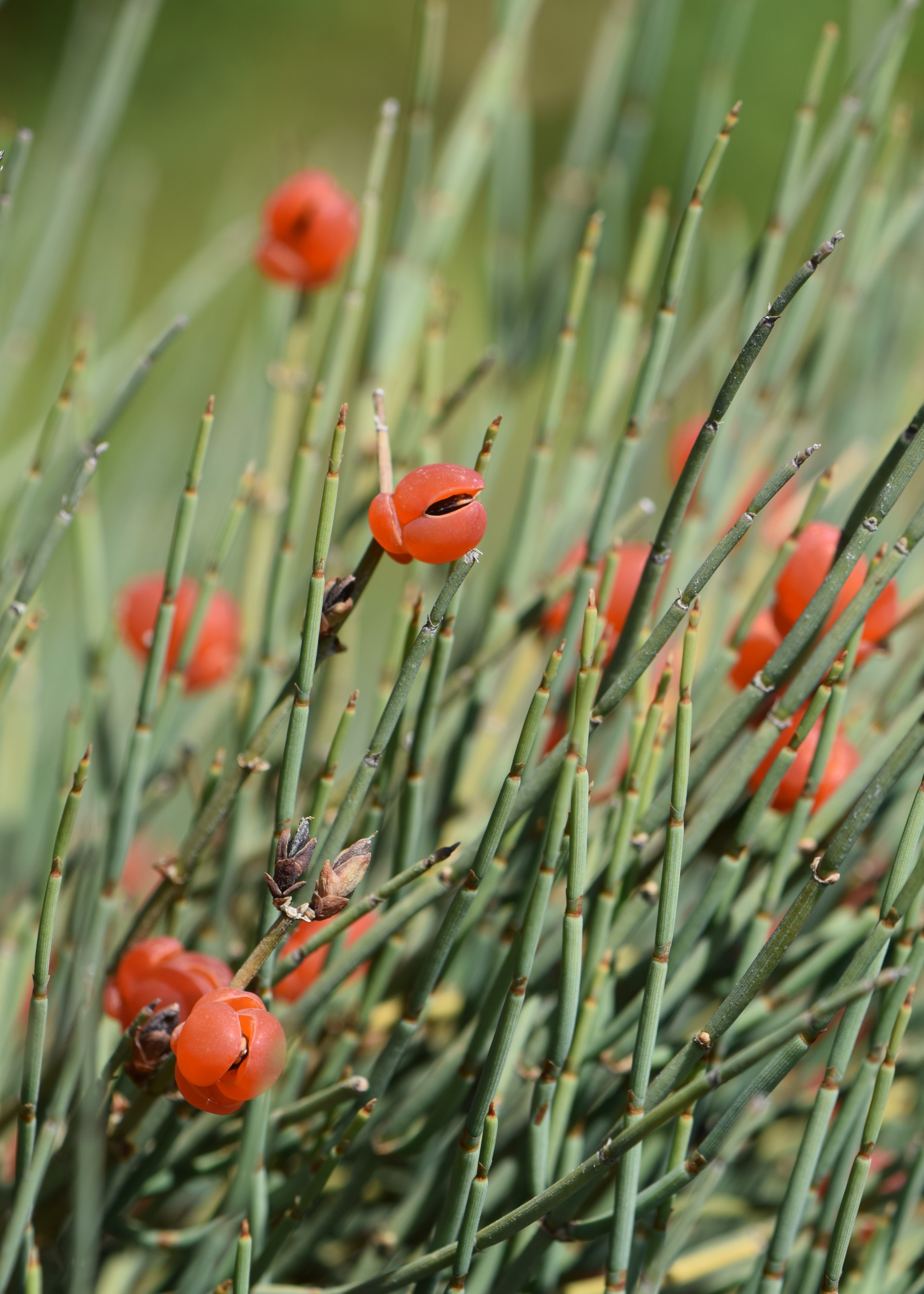
Ephedra gerardiana

In the late 19th century, the highly conservative Zoroastrians of Yazd (Iran) were found to use ephedra, which was locally known as hum or homa and which they exported to the Indian Zoroastrians.

In 1989 Harry Falk noted that, in the texts, both haoma and soma were said to enhance alertness and awareness, did not coincide with the consciousness altering effects of an entheogen, and that "there is nothing shamanistic or visionary either in early Vedic or in Old Iranian texts", Falk also asserted that the three varieties of ephedra that yield ephedrine (Ephedra gerardiana, E. major procera and E. intermedia) also have the properties attributed to haoma by the texts of the Avesta. Falk concludes that "there is no need to look for a plant other than Ephedra, the one plant used to this day by the Parsis". At the conclusion of the 1999 Haoma-Soma workshop in Leiden, Jan E. M. Houben writes: "despite strong attempts to do away with ephedra by those who are eager to see sauma as a hallucinogen, its status as a serious candidate for the Rigvedic Soma and Avestan Haoma still stands".

== See also ==
- Ambrosia, the sustenance of the Greek gods
- Chandra, a god associated with soma
- Haoma, an equivalent divine plant in Zoroastrianism
- Manna, an edible equivalent in Bible and Quran
- Mead
- Sima (mead)
- Soma, a drug used by characters in the novel Brave New World.
- Carisoprodol, sold under the brand name Soma

== Sources ==
- Anthony, David W. (2007), The Horse The Wheel And Language. How Bronze-Age Riders From the Eurasian Steppes Shaped The Modern World, Princeton University Press
- Bakels, C.C. 2003. “The contents of ceramic vessels in the Bactria-Margiana Archaeological Complex, Turkmenistan.” in Electronic Journal of Vedic Studies, Vol. 9. Issue 1c (May 2003)
- Beckwith, Christopher I. (2011), Empires of the Silk Road: A History of Central Eurasia from the Bronze Age to the Present, Princeton University Press
- Brough, John (1971). "Soma and "Amanita muscaria"". Bulletin of the School of Oriental and African Studies. 34 (2): 331–362. doi:10.1017/S0041977X0012957X. JSTOR 612695. S2CID 84458441.
- Clark, Matthew (2019). "Soma and Haoma: Ayahuasca analogues from the Late Bronze Age". Journal of Psychedelic Studies. 3 (2): 104–116. doi:10.1556/2054.2019.013. ISSN 2559-9283.
- Falk, Harry (1989). "Soma I and II". Bulletin of SOAS. 52 (1): 77–90. doi:10.1017/S0041977X00023077.
- Feeney, Kevin (2020). "Fly Agaric: A Compendium of History, Pharmacology, Mythology, & Exploration". ResearchGate.
- Furst, Peter T. (1976). Hallucinogens and Culture. Chandler & Sharp. pp. 96–108. ISBN 0-88316-517-1.
- Heesterman, Jan (2005). "Vedism and Brahmanism". In Jones, Lindsay (ed.). The Encyclopedia of Religion. Vol. 14 (2nd ed.). Macmillan Reference. pp. 9552–9553. ISBN 0-02-865733-0.
- Houben, Jan E. M. (4 May 2003). "The Soma-Haoma problem". Electronic Journal of Vedic Studies. 9/1a. Archived from the original on 29 July 2010.
- Jamison, Stephanie (2015). The Rigveda – Earliest Religious Poetry of India. Oxford University Press. ISBN 978-0190633394.
- Jay, Mike. Blue Tide: The Search for Soma. Autonomedia, 1999.
- Kuz'mina, Elena Efimovna (2007), J. P. Mallory (ed.), The Origin of the Indo-Iranians, Brill, ISBN 978-9004160545
- Lamborn Wilson, Peter. Ploughing the clouds:The search for Irish Soma, City Lights,1999.
- McKenna, Terence (1 January 1992). Food of The Gods. Bantam Books. pp. 100–120. ISBN 9780553371307.
- McDonald, A. "A botanical perspective on the identity of soma (Nelumbo nucifera Gaertn.) based on scriptural and iconographic records" in Economic Botany 2004;58
- Oldenberg, Hermann (1988) [1894]. The Religion of the Veda. Motilal Banarsidass Publ. p. 205. ISBN 978-81-208-0392-3.
- Singh, Upinder (2008). A History of Ancient and Early Medieval India: From the Stone Age to the 12th century. Pearson Education India. ISBN 978-81-317-1120-0.
- Wasson, Robert Gordon (1968). "Soma: Divine Mushroom of Immortality". Ethno-Mycological Studies. 1. New York. ISBN 0-15-683800-1.
