= A. acida =

A. acida may refer to:

- Alvania acida, a sea snail
- Averrhoa acida, a synonym of Phyllanthus acidus, known as the gooseberry tree
- Asclepias acida, a synonym of Cynanchum acidum, a leafless shrub
