= Ephedra (medicine) =

Medicinal preparation from the plant Ephedra sinica

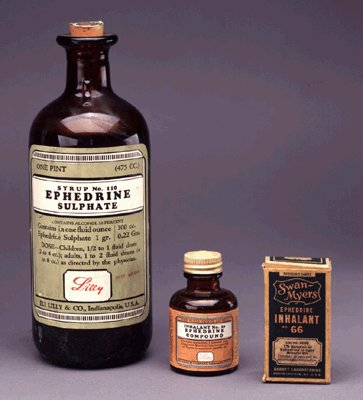
Bottle of ephedrine, an alkaloid found in ephedra

Ephedra is a medicinal preparation from the plant Ephedra sinica. (Note: The Chinese Pharmacopoeia calls for the grassy stems to be used as Ma-huang, and the root and rhizome to be used as Ma-huang-gen. Besides E. sinica, E. intermedia and E. equisetina are also acceptable sources.) Several additional species belonging to the genus Ephedra have traditionally been used for a variety of medicinal purposes, and are a possible candidate for the soma plant of Indo-Iranian religion. It has been used in traditional Chinese medicine, in which it is referred to as Ma Huang, for more than 2,000 years. Native Americans and Mormon pioneers drank a tea brewed from other Ephedra species, called "Mormon tea" and "Indian tea".

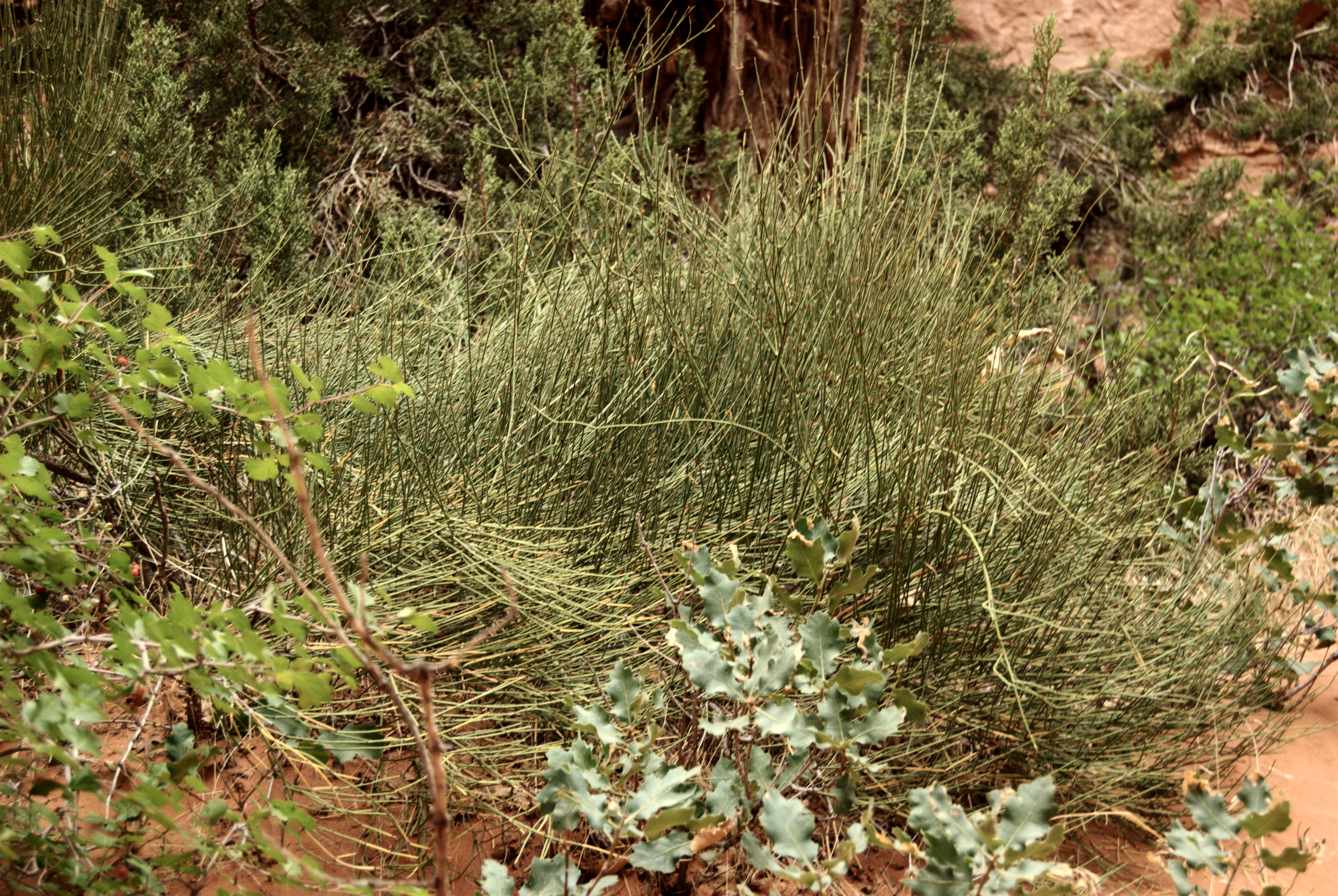
Mormon tea (Ephedra funerea) growing in the wild in the Fiery Furnace area of Arches National Park near Moab, Utah

Dietary supplements containing ephedra alkaloids are unsafe, with reports of serious side effects and ephedra-related deaths. In response to accumulating evidence of adverse effects and deaths related to ephedra, the U.S. Food and Drug Administration (FDA) banned the sale of supplements containing ephedrine alkaloids in 2004. The ban was challenged in court by ephedra manufacturers, but ultimately upheld in 2006 by the U.S. Court of Appeals for the Tenth Circuit. Ephedra extracts not containing ephedrine have not been banned by the FDA and are still sold legally.

== Biochemistry and effects ==
A wide variety of alkaloid and non-alkaloid compounds have been identified in various species of Ephedra. Of the six ephedrine-type ingredients found in ephedra (at concentrations of 0.02-3.4%), the most common are ephedrine and pseudoephedrine, which are the sources of its stimulant and thermogenic effects. These compounds stimulate the brain, increase heart rate, constrict blood vessels (increasing blood pressure), and expand bronchial tubes (making breathing easier). Their thermogenic properties cause an increase in metabolism, as evidenced by an increase in body heat.

Ephedra is widely used by athletes as a performance-enhancing drug, despite a lack of evidence that it improves athletic performance. Ephedra may also be used as a precursor in the illicit manufacture of methamphetamine.

Ephedra has been used as a weight-loss aid, sometimes in combination with aspirin and caffeine. Some studies in regulated and supervised environments have shown that ephedra is effective for marginal short-term weight loss (0.9 kg/month more than the placebo), although it was untested whether such weight loss is maintained. However, several reports have documented a number of adverse events attributable to unregulated ephedra supplements.

Adverse effects of ephedra consumption may include severe skin reactions, irritability, nervousness, dizziness, trembling, headache, insomnia, profuse perspiration, dehydration, itchy scalp and skin, vomiting, and hyperthermia. More serious potential side effects include irregular heartbeat, seizures, heart attack, stroke, and death.

== Purity and dosage ==
There are no formal requirements for standardization or quality control of dietary supplements in the United States, and the dosage of effective ingredients in supplements may vary widely from brand to brand or batch to batch. Studies of ephedra supplements have found significant discrepancies between the labeled dose and the actual amount of ephedra in the product. Significant variation in ephedrine alkaloid levels, by as much as 10-fold, was seen even from lot to lot within the same brand.

== Regulation in the United States ==
Escalating concerns regarding the safety of ephedra supplements led the FDA to ban the sale of supplements containing ephedrine alkaloids (specifically ephedrine, pseudoephedrine, norephedrine, and methylephedrine) in the United States in 2004. This ban was challenged by supplement manufacturers and initially overturned, but ultimately upheld.

=== Initial concerns and industry response ===
In 1997, in response to mounting concern over the serious side effects of ephedra, the FDA proposed a ban on products containing 8 mg or more of ephedrine alkaloids and stricter labeling of low-dose ephedra supplements. The FDA also proposed that ephedra labels be required to disclose the health risks of ephedra, such as heart attack, stroke, and death.

In response, the supplement industry created a public relations group, the Ephedra Education Council, to oppose the changes, and commissioned a scientific review by a private consulting firm, which reported that Ephedra was safe. The Ephedra Education Council also attempted to block the publication of a study confirming wide discrepancies between the labeled potency of supplements and the actual amount of ephedra in the product.

Metabolife, makers of the best-selling brand of ephedra supplement, had received over 14,000 complaints of adverse events associated with its product. These reports were not initially provided to the FDA. Co-founder of Metabolife, Michael Ellis, was sentenced in 2008 to six months in federal prison for his failure to report adverse effects from his company's products to the FDA. Senators Orrin Hatch (R. Utah) and Tom Harkin (D. Iowa), authors of the Dietary Supplements Health and Education Act, questioned the scientific basis for the FDA's proposed labeling changes and suggested that the number of problems reported were insufficient to warrant regulatory action. At the time, Senator Hatch's son was working for a firm hired to lobby Congress and the FDA on behalf of ephedra manufacturers.

In addition to the activities of the Ephedra Education Council, Metabolife spent more than $4 million between 1998 and 2000 lobbying against state regulation of ephedra in Texas. Business Week reported that efforts to regulate ephedra and other potentially harmful supplements had been "beaten down by deep-pocketed industry lobbying."

In 2000, the FDA withdrew the proposed labeling changes and restrictions.

=== Additional evidence and deaths ===
A review of ephedra-related adverse reactions, published in the New England Journal of Medicine in 2000, found a number of cases of sudden cardiac death or severe disability resulting from ephedra use, many of which occurred in young adults using ephedra in the labeled dosages. Subsequently, in response to pressure from the consumer advocacy group Public Citizen, Metabolife was compelled by the Department of Justice in 2002 to turn over reports of over 15,000 ephedra-related adverse events, ranging from insomnia to death, which the company had previously withheld from the FDA. Use of ephedra was considered to have possibly contributed to the death of Minnesota Vikings offensive lineman Korey Stringer from heatstroke in 2001.

Steve Bechler, a pitcher for the Baltimore Orioles, died of complications from heatstroke following a spring training workout on February 17, 2003. The medical examiner found that ephedra toxicity played a "significant role" in Bechler's sudden death. Following Bechler's death, the FDA re-opened its efforts to regulate ephedra use. According to Bruce Silverglade, legal director for the Center for Science in the Public Interest, "All of a sudden [after Bechler's death] Congress dropped objections to an ephedra ban and started demanding that the FDA act."

Senator Orrin Hatch (R. Utah), who in 1999 had helped block the FDA's attempts to regulate ephedra, said in March 2003 that "...it has been obvious to even the most casual observer that problems exist", and called FDA action to regulate ephedra "long overdue."

=== Ephedrine supplement ban ===
In response to renewed calls for the regulation of ephedra, the U.S. Department of Health and Human Services commissioned a large meta-analysis of ephedra's safety and efficacy by the RAND Corporation. This study found that ephedra promoted modest short-term weight loss, but there was insufficient data to determine whether it was effective for long-term weight loss or performance enhancement. The use of ephedrine alkaloids in this study was associated with significant gastrointestinal, psychiatric, and autonomic side effects. Almost simultaneously, a study in Annals of Internal Medicine found that ephedrine alkaloids were 100 to 700 times more likely to cause a significant adverse reaction than other commonly used supplements such as kava or Ginkgo biloba.

On December 30, 2003, the FDA issued a press release recommending that consumers stop buying and using products containing ephedrine alkaloids, and indicating its intention to ban the sale of ephedrine alkaloid-containing supplements. Subsequently, on April 12, 2004, the FDA issued a final rule banning the sale of ephedrine alkaloid-containing dietary supplements. Tommy Thompson, the Secretary of Health and Human Services, stated that "...These products pose unacceptable health risks, and any consumers who are still using them should stop immediately." Products containing ephedra extract remain legal to this day.

=== Legal challenges ===
Nutraceutical Corporation, a supplement manufacturer based in Park City, Utah, challenged the legality of the FDA's ban of Ephedra alkaloids as exceeding the authority given to the agency by the Dietary Health Supplements and Education Act. Nutraceutical Corporation stated that while they did not intend to restart marketing ephedra, they were concerned about the scope of the FDA's regulatory action. Judge Tena Campbell of Utah's Federal District Court ruled that the FDA had not proven that low doses of ephedra alkaloids were unsafe, although she also noted that studies to address the safety of low-dose ephedra would be unethical. Nevertheless, her ruling overturned the ban on the sale of ephedra alkaloids in the state of Utah, and called into question whether the ban could be enforced anywhere in the United States.

The ruling was appealed to the U.S. Court of Appeals for the Tenth Circuit in Denver, Colorado. On August 17, 2006, the Appeals Court upheld the FDA's ban on Ephedra alkaloids, finding that the 133,000-page administrative record compiled by the FDA supported the agency's finding that ephedra alkaloids posed an unreasonable risk to consumers. Nutraceutical Corp. filed a petition for a writ of certiorari seeking a rehearing on the ban of ephedra alkaloids; however, on May 14, 2007 the United States Supreme Court declined to hear this petition. The sale of ephedra alkaloid-containing dietary supplements remains illegal in the United States. Sales of products containing ephedra extract not containing ephedrine remain legal.

== Use in sports ==
Ephedrine is listed as a banned substance by both the International Olympic Committee and the World Anti-Doping Agency. The National Football League banned players from using ephedra as a dietary supplement in 2001 after the death of Minnesota Vikings offensive tackle Korey Stringer; ephedra was found in Stringer's locker and lawyers for the team contended that it contributed to his death. The substance is also banned by the National Basketball Association. It was also banned by Major League Baseball after the 2003 death of Steve Bechler. Nonetheless, ephedra remains widely used by athletes; a 2006 survey of collegiate hockey players found that nearly half had used ephedra believing it enhanced their athletic performance.

=== Prominent cases ===
In the 1994 FIFA World Cup, the Argentine footballer Diego Armando Maradona tested positive for ephedrine. The Japanese motorcycle racer Noriyuki Haga tested positive for ephedrine in 2000, being disqualified from two races and banned from two more as a result. NFL punter Todd Sauerbrun of the Denver Broncos was suspended for the first month of the 2006 season after testing positive for ephedrine.

== Connections to Soma rituals ==
=== History of Soma ===
Throughout the many hymns, prayers, and philosophy found in the Vedas (written around 1500 BC), a mysterious plant is mentioned often and with great reverence. This plant alternates from a holy substance to an actual personified god and is considered a teacher, doctor, medicine, a bringer of insight, and a vector of inspiration. The deity version of Soma was associated with medicinal herbs and the moon and was considered a bringer of health and prosperity. The plant was an essential aspect of Vedic religion to alter one’s mind, enabling communion with the divine. The ritual drinking of Soma is also mentioned in the ancient Zoroastrian text, the Avesta, where the rituals and importance of the plant are very similar to those in Vedic culture but are instead called by the name haoma. It is unknown why, but eventually in both the Vedic and Zoroastrian cultures a substitute substance was used in these religious ceremonies and over time the definitive identity of Soma-Haoma has been lost. There is much debate over which species of plant are the sacred plant of the Vedic and Zoroastrian faiths.

=== Ritual use of Ephedra ===
The Rigveda is one of the four oldest and most sacred collections of stories in Hinduism. In the Rigveda soma is a drink consumed by two of the main gods; Agni and Indra. In the texts, the drink helped the gods in battle by strengthening them physically. Because of this, soma was given and consumed by warriors before wartime or a battle. The drink was supposed to give the warriors strength and luck in the upcoming conflict. Immortality is also a quality associated with soma due to it being a drink of the divine. At religious ceremonies the drink was consumed to give consumers longevity in life. At birth the drink was also given to the babies for these same reasons.

In Zoroastrianism, the drink is called haoma and has similar uses. Just like in Hinduism, the drink was related to immortality and long life. Haoma was the first thing newborns drank. This assured the child would be healthy and live a long life. The drink was also administered to people close to death to revive them back into good health.

The physical appearance of Ephedra is also a reason it is believed to be the soma plant. According to the Vedic text Rigveda, the plant comprising soma is shaped like an arrow. Ephedra sinica is a gymnosperm that forms stalks with buds on the end. It is easy to see how this shape could be described as an arrow. Another text refers to soma as a twig, which is much like Ephedra sinica when it is dried out.

== See also ==
- Chinese medicine
- Sida cordifolia
- Pinellia
- Synephrine
