= Fiery furnace =

Fiery furnace may refer to:

- The fiery furnace in the biblical account of Shadrach, Meshach, and Abednego (Daniel 3)
- Fiery furnace of Nimrod, in Jewish tradition, from which Abraham is miraculously saved
- Fiery Furnace (Arches National Park), a region of Arches National Park in Utah
- The Fiery Furnaces, an American indie rock band

== See also ==
- The Burning Fiery Furnace, a 1966 opera by Benjamin Britten
- Furnace (disambiguation)
