= Mandala 9 =

Ninth book of the Rigveda

The ninth Mandala of the Rigveda, also called the Soma Mandala, has 114 hymns, entirely (although Griffith marks 9.5 as dedicated to the Apris) devoted to Sóma Pávamāna, "Purifying Soma", the sacred potion of the Vedic religion. Similar to Mandala 8, it cannot be dated within the relative chronology of the Rigveda as a whole; dealing with the Soma cult, a practice reaching back into Proto-Indo-Iranian times (late 3rd millennium BC), some of its hymns may contain the very oldest parts of the Rigveda, while other hymns may be rather recent relative to the other books. As with book 8, each hymn should be studied independently, since the Soma Mandala was not compiled by the redactors in its preserved form on grounds of authorship or clan affiliation, but topically, grouping the Soma hymns.

== List of incipits ==
9.1 (713) svâdiṣṭhayā mádiṣṭhayā
9.2 (714) pávasva devavîr áti
9.3 (715) eṣá devó ámartiyaḥ
9.4 (716) sánā ca soma jéṣi ca
9.5 (717) sámiddho viśvátas pátiḥ
9.6 (718) mandráyā soma dhârayā
9.7 (719) ásṛgram índavaḥ pathâ
9.8 (720) eté sómā abhí priyám
9.9 (721) pári priyâ diváḥ kavír
9.10 (722) prá svānâso ráthā iva
9.11 (723) úpāsmai gāyatā naraḥ
9.12 (724) sómā asṛgram índavaḥ
9.13 (725) sómaḥ punānó arṣati
9.14 (726) pári prâsiṣyadat kavíḥ
9.15 (727) eṣá dhiyâ yāty áṇviyā
9.16 (728) prá te sotâra oṇíyo
9.17 (729) prá nimnéneva síndhavo
9.18 (730) pári svānó * giriṣṭh~âḥ
9.19 (731) yát soma citrám ukthíyaṃ
9.20 (732) prá kavír devávītaye
9.21 (733) eté dhāvanti índavaḥ
9.22 (734) eté sómāsa āśávo
9.23 (735) sómā asṛgram āśávo
9.24 (736) prá sómāso adhanviṣuḥ
9.25 (737) pávasva dakṣasâdhano
9.26 (738) tám amṛkṣanta vājínam
9.27 (739) eṣá kavír abhíṣṭutaḥ
9.28 (740) eṣá vājî hitó nŕbhir
9.29 (741) prá asya dhârā akṣaran
9.30 (742) prá dhârā asya śuṣmíṇo
9.31 (743) prá sómāsaḥ suādhíyaḥ
9.32 (744) prá sómāso madacyútaḥ
9.33 (745) prá sómāso vipaścíto
9.34 (746) [Some Pavamana.] prá svānó * dhârayā tánā
9.35 (747) â naḥ pavasva dhârayā
9.36 (748) ásarji ráthiyo yathā
9.37 (749) sá sutáḥ pītáye vŕṣā
9.38 (750) eṣá u syá vŕṣā rátho
9.39 (751) āśúr arṣa bṛhanmate
9.40 (752) punānó akramīd abhí
9.41 (753) prá yé gâvo ná bhûrṇayas
9.42 (754) janáyan rocanâ divó
9.43 (755) yó átya iva mṛjyáte
9.44 (756) prá ṇa indo mahé tána
9.45 (757) sá pavasva mádāya káṃ
9.46 (758) ásṛgran devávītaye
9.47 (759) ayâ sómaḥ sukṛtyáyā
9.48 (760) táṃ tvā nṛmṇâni bíbhrataṃ
9.49 (761) pávasva vṛṣṭím â sú no
9.50 (762) út te śúṣmāsa īrate
9.51 (763) ádhvaryo ádribhiḥ sutáṃ
9.52 (764) pári dyukṣáḥ sanádrayir
9.53 (765) út te śúṣmāso asthū
9.54 (766) asyá pratnâm ánu dyútaṃ
9.55 (767) yávaṃ-yavaṃ no ándhasā
9.56 (768) pári sóma ṛtám bṛhád
9.57 (769) prá te dhârā asaścáto
9.58 (770) tárat sá mandî dhāvati
9.59 (771) pávasva gojíd aśvajíd
9.60 (772) prá gāyatréṇa gāyata
9.61 (773) ayâ vītî pári srava
9.62 (774) eté asṛgram índavas
9.63 (775) [Soma Pavanana.] â pavasva sahasríṇaṃ
9.64 (776) vŕṣā soma dyumâṁ asi
9.65 (777) hinvánti sûram úsrayaḥ
9.66 (778) pávasva viśvacarṣaṇe
9.67 (779) [Soma and Others.] tuváṃ somāsi dhārayúr
9.68 (780) prá devám áchā mádhumanta índavo
9.69 (781) íṣur ná dhánvan práti dhīyate matír
9.70 (782) trír asmai saptá dhenávo duduhre
9.71 (783) â dákṣiṇā sṛjyate śuṣmî āsádaṃ
9.72 (784) hárim mṛjanti aruṣó ná yujyate
9.73 (785) srákve drapsásya dhámataḥ sám asvarann
9.74 (786) śíśur ná jātó áva cakradad váne
9.75 (787) abhí priyâṇi pavate cánohito
9.76 (788) dhartâ diváḥ pavate kŕtviyo ráso
9.77 (789) eṣá prá kóśe mádhumāṁ acikradad
9.78 (790) prá râjā vâcaṃ janáyann asiṣyadad
9.79 (791) acodáso no dhanuvantu índavaḥ
9.80 (792) sómasya dhârā pavate nṛcákṣasa
9.81 (793) prá sómasya pávamānasya ūrmáya
9.82 (794) ásāvi sómo aruṣó vŕṣā hárī
9.83 (795) pavítraṃ te vítatam brahmaṇas pate
9.84 (796) pávasva devamâdano vícarṣaṇir
9.85 (797) índrāya soma súṣutaḥ pári srava
9.86 (798) prá ta āśávaḥ pavamāna dhījávo
9.87 (799) prá tú drava pári kóśaṃ ní ṣīda
9.88 (800) ayáṃ sóma indara túbhya * sunve
9.89 (801) prá ū syá váhniḥ pathíyābhir asyān
9.90 (802) prá hinvānó janitâ ródasīyo
9.91 (803) ásarji vákvā ráthiye yáthājaú
9.92 (804) pári svānó * hárir aṃśúḥ pavítre
9.93 (805) sākamúkṣo marjayanta svásāro
9.94 (806) ádhi yád asmin vājínīva śúbha
9.95 (807) kánikranti hárir â sṛjyámānaḥ
9.96 (808) prá senānîḥ śûro ágre ráthānāṃ
9.97 (809) asyá preṣâ hemánā pūyámāno
9.98 (810) abhí no vājasâtamaṃ
9.99 (811) â haryatâya dhṛṣṇáve
9.100 (812) abhî navante adrúhaḥ
9.101 (813) purójitī vo ándhasaḥ
9.102 (814) krāṇâ śíśur mahîn~āṃ
9.103 (815) prá punānâya vedháse
9.104 (816) sákhāya â ní ṣīdata
9.105 (817) táṃ vaḥ sakhāyo mádāya
9.106 (818) índram ácha sutâ imé
9.107 (819) párītó ṣiñcatā sutáṃ
9.108 (820) pávasva mádhumattama
9.109 (821) pári prá dhanva índrāya soma
9.110 (822) pári ū ṣú prá dhanva vâjasātaye
9.111 (823) ayâ rucâ háriṇiyā punānó
9.112 (824) nānānáṃ vâ u no dhíyo
9.113 (825) śaryaṇâvati sómam
9.114 (826) yá índoḥ pávamānasya
