= Steve Bechler =

American baseball pitcher (1979–2003)

- Pitcher
- Born: November 18, 1979; Medford, Oregon, U.S.
- Died: February 17, 2003 (aged 23); Fort Lauderdale, Florida, U.S.
- Batted: Right Threw: Right

MLB debut
- September 6, 2002, for the Baltimore Orioles

Last MLB appearance
- September 22, 2002, for the Baltimore Orioles

MLB statistics
- Win–loss record: 0–0
- Earned run average: 13.50
- Strikeouts: 3
- Stats at Baseball Reference

Teams
- Baltimore Orioles (2002)

Steven Scott Bechler (November 18, 1979 – February 17, 2003) was an American professional baseball pitcher who played in Major League Baseball (MLB) for the Baltimore Orioles.

After starring for the South Medford High School baseball team, Bechler was selected by the Orioles in the third round of the 1998 MLB draft. Following five seasons in Minor League Baseball, Bechler made his major league debut with the Orioles in 2002.

During spring training in 2003, he died of heat stroke while participating in conditioning drills. A medical examiner found that Bechler's use of the supplement ephedra contributed to his death. Following this revelation, the Food and Drug Administration opened an inquiry, which resulted in the banning of ephedra products in the United States. He and Tom Gastall are the only two Orioles to die while still active players.

== Early life ==
Bechler was born on November 18, 1979, in Medford, Oregon, to Ernest and Patricia Bechler. He had one brother. At the age of seven, he began playing baseball. As a youth, he competed in the Medford American Little League, Babe Ruth League, and American Legion Baseball. He was a member of the 1997 American Legion World Series runners-up. Bechler had asthma as a child, and endured multiple episodes of heat stroke while in high school.

== Baseball career ==
Bechler attended South Medford High School in Medford, Oregon. He graduated in 1998. Playing for the school's baseball team, he was named to the All-Oregon third team in his senior year.

Heading into the 1998 Major League Baseball draft, Baseball America rated Bechler the best high school prospect from the state of Oregon. The Baltimore Orioles selected him in the third round draft. Bechler signed with the Orioles, receiving a $257,000 signing bonus. He made his professional debut in Minor League Baseball with the Gulf Coast Orioles of the Rookie-level Gulf Coast League that year. He pitched for the Delmarva Shorebirds of the Single-A South Atlantic League in 1999, and for the Frederick Keys of the High-A Carolina League in 2000. In 2001, he pitched for Frederick, and was named a Carolina League All-Star. He did not appear in the All-Star Game, as he was promoted to the Rochester Red Wings of the Triple-A International League. After struggling in two outings for Rochester, he was demoted to the Bowie Baysox of the Double-A Eastern League, where he remained for the rest of the season. After the 2001 season, the Orioles assigned Bechler to the Maryvale Saguaros of the Arizona Fall League. The Orioles added Bechler to their 40-man roster to protect him from being eligible in the Rule 5 draft.

In 2002, Bechler pitched for Bowie and Rochester. He had a 2–1 win–loss record with a 3.42 earned run average (ERA) with Bowie and 6–11 record and a 4.09 ERA with Rochester. At the end of the minor league season, the Orioles promoted Bechler to the major leagues. He appeared in three games for the Orioles, pitching 4 2/3 innings, in which he allowed six hits, four walks, three home runs, and recorded three strikeouts. He suffered a strained hamstring in his final appearance.

== Personal life ==
On October 22, 2002, Bechler married Kiley Mae Nixon at Community Bible Church in Central Point, Oregon. The couple had a daughter, Hallie, who was born in April 2003, two months after her father's death.

== Death ==
On February 16, 2003, during the Orioles' spring training camp in Fort Lauderdale, Florida, Bechler collapsed while participating in conditioning drills. He was rushed to a nearby hospital, where he died from multiple organ failure the following morning, at the age of 23. His body temperature had reached 108 °F (42 °C). Against the advice of his trainer, he was taking ephedra; at the time, it was reported that he had been taking it to lose weight, though his widow said in 2020 that he had been using it as an energy supplement. While it was also initially reported that Bechler had not eaten for a day or two before his collapse, teammate Matt Riley later recalled that Bechler had gone to dinner with teammates the night before, though he ate very little. However, Bechler did not consume anything aside from ephedra pills on the morning of February 16, possibly because he was running late.

An autopsy performed by Broward County Medical Examiner Joshua Perper concluded that Bechler's death was caused by a pre-existing liver condition, mild hypertension, his weight (he weighed 249 pounds (113 kg) upon arriving at spring training, and was exercising hard), the heat and humidity of the Florida weather, low food consumption, and the toxicity of ephedra.

At the time of Bechler's death, ephedra was banned by the International Olympic Committee, the National Collegiate Athletic Association, and the National Football League, but not by Major League Baseball, where its use remained common among players. Bud Selig, the Commissioner of Baseball, called for a ban in the wake of Bechler's death. Numerous teams banned the use of ephedra in their clubhouses. The Food and Drug Administration (FDA), which had previously chosen not to ban ephedra, subsequently re-opened its efforts to regulate it. The United States Congress dropped its previous objections to a ban, and Bechler's parents testified in front of Congress. The FDA announced its decision to ban ephedra on December 30.

Bechler was cremated, and on the six month anniversary of his death his wife, Kiley Mae Nixon, scattered his ashes on the pitcher's mound of Oriole Park at Camden Yards. She filed a wrongful death claim against Nutraquest, the manufacturers of the supplement, seeking $600 million in damages. The lawsuit against Nutraquest was suspended in October 2003 when the company filed for bankruptcy under Chapter 11 of the United States Code. Bechler's parents started The Steve Bechler Athletic Scholarship in his memory, which provides $1,000 annually to a graduating South Medford High School baseball or softball player who intends to compete in college.

== See also ==
- List of baseball players who died during their careers
