= Banisteriopsis elegans =

Scientific classification
- Kingdom: Plantae
- Clade: Tracheophytes
- Clade: Angiosperms
- Clade: Eudicots
- Clade: Rosids
- Order: Malpighiales
- Family: Malpighiaceae
- Genus: Banisteriopsis
- Species: B. elegans

Binomial name
- Banisteriopsis elegans (Triana & Planch) Sandwith

Subspecies
- Banisteriopsis elegans var. ciliata (Nied.) Sandwith; Banisteriopsis elegans subsp. cordata (Nied.) Sandwith; Banisteriopsis elegans var. pulcherrima Sandwith

Synonyms
- Banisteria elegans Triana & Planch; Banisteria elegans var. ciliata Nied.; Banisteria elegans subsp. cordata Nied.; Banisteria elegans subsp. elegans; Banisteria elegans var. grandifolia Nied.; Banisteria elegans var. guatemalensis Nied.; Banisteria elegans subsp. ovata Nied.; Banisteria elegans var. pubescens Nied.; Banisteria elegans var. typica (Triana & Planch.) Nied.; Banisteriopsis martiniana var. elegans (Triana & Planch) Cuatrec.; Banisteriopsis scalariformis Schery; Banisteriopsis speciosa Small

Species of flowering plant

Banisteriopsis elegans is a species of flowering plants in the family Malpighiaceae. It is found in Colombia and Mexico.
