= Somayaji =

Somayaji is a title within the Smarta Brahmin community for those that perform the Somayaga srauta ritual, or descendants of such people. The surname is most commonly seen among the Tulu Smarta Brahmins, Tamil, Nambudiri Brahmins from Kerala, and Telugu Vedic Brahmins.

- Nilakantha Somayaji was a major Indian mathematician and astronomer of Kerala.
- Puthumana Somayaji was a 15th-century mathematician from Kerala, India .
- Tikkana or Tikkana Somayaji is the second poet of “Trinity of Poets (Kavi Trayam)” that translated Mahabharatam into Telugu.
- Asuri Kesava Somayaji, the father of Ramanuja, a pre-eminent figure in the Srivaishnava sect of Hinduism.
- Ganti Jogi Somayaji, famous Telugu linguist and poet.
