= Fiery Furnace (Arches National Park) =

Rock formation in Arches National Park in Utah, United States

Coordinates: 38°45′03″N 109°34′01″W

The Fiery Furnace is a collection of narrow sandstone canyons, fins and natural arches located near the center of Arches National Park in Utah, United States.

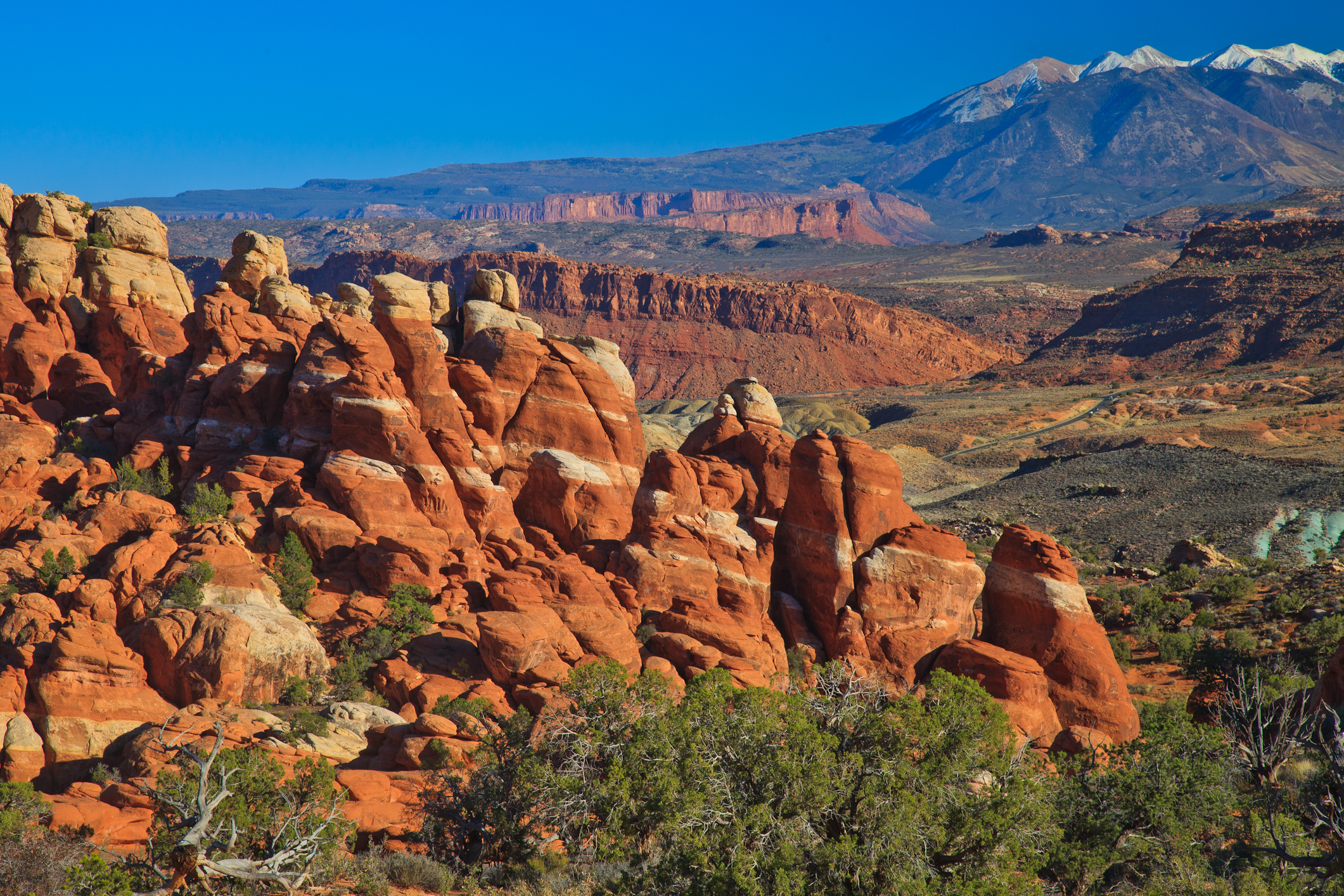
Pinnacles of the Fiery Furnace

The area is a popular hiking destination that was named for the reddish hue it exhibits in sunset light. Arches National Park has more than 2,000 cataloged sandstone arches, with some being located in the Fiery Furnace, including Walk Through Arch, Crawl Through Arch, Skull Arch, Kissing Turtles Arch, and Surprise Arch.

== Ecology ==
The Fiery Furnace contains a variety of plant species, including one of the largest known concentrations of Canyonlands biscuitroot. Fragile ecological features such as biological soil crust and ephemeral pools are also found within the Fiery Furnace, and are vulnerable to visitor impact.

== Visitor Access ==
Due to the environmental impacts of heavy visitation, the National Park Service initiated a permit system in 1994 to limit access to the Fiery Furnace. Visitors may purchase permits to hike in the Fiery Furnace alone or join a ranger-guided tour. Two trails lead hikers from the parking lot into the Fiery Furnace, but once inside, hikers must navigate the trailless labyrinth of rock formations. To minimize impact on the plant communities, visitors must walk along sandy washes or on sandstone surfaces. During the approximately 2 mi (3.2 km) ranger-guided tour, which lasts about three hours, visitors will encounter uneven terrain, drop-offs, and narrow passages. Rangers describe the history of the area, while noting the most prominent arches and other geologic features. Visitors can also choose to obtain a self-guided permit and hike through the Fiery Furnace on their own; however, they are required to watch an orientation video describing the area and how to minimize their impact.

== Gallery ==
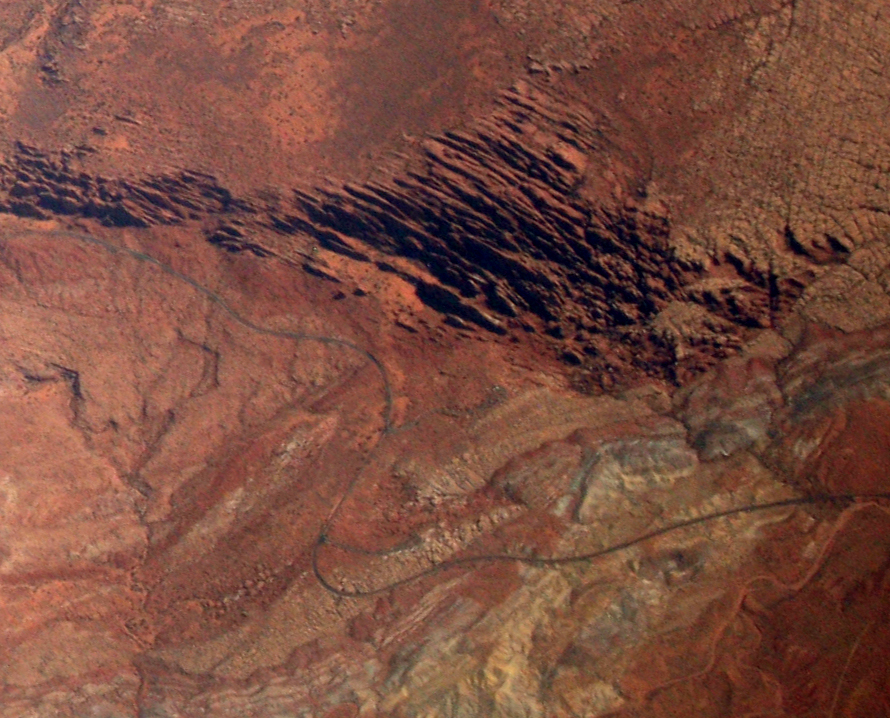
Aerial view with park road along bottom

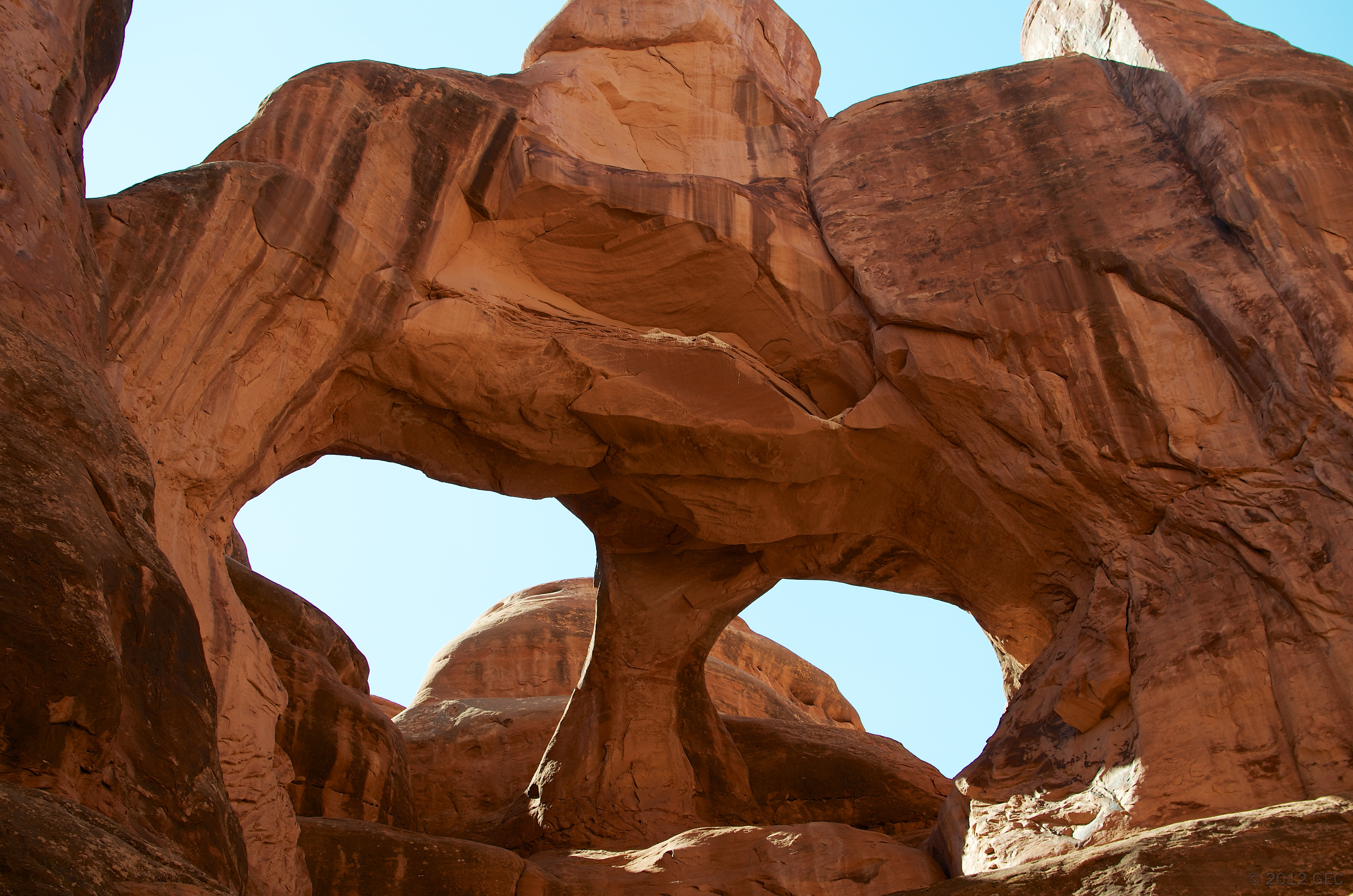
Skull Arch

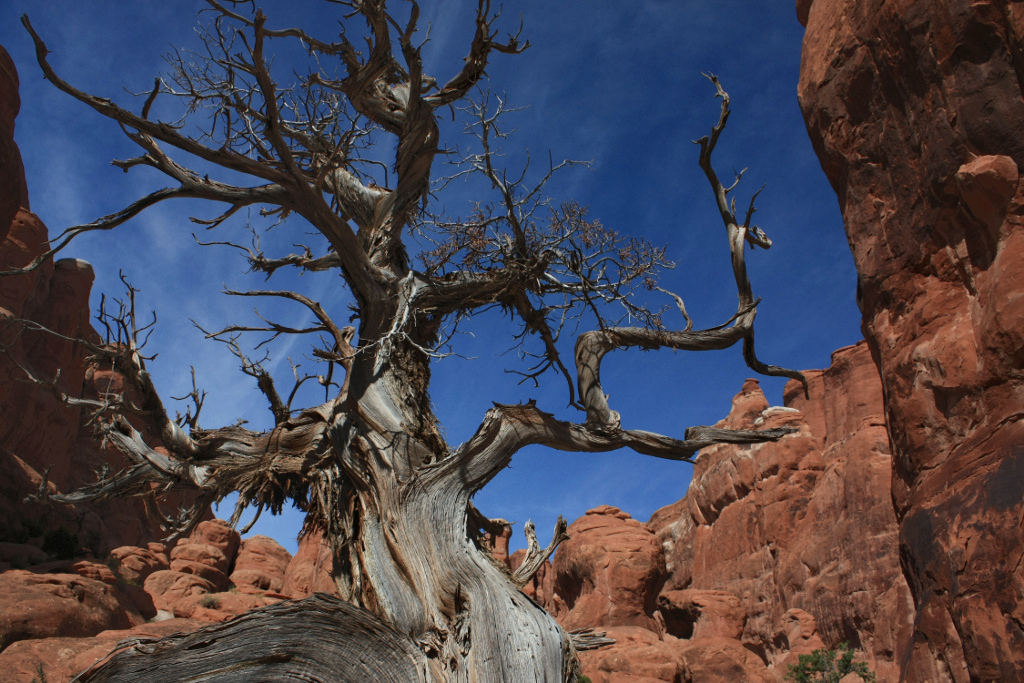
Juniper tree

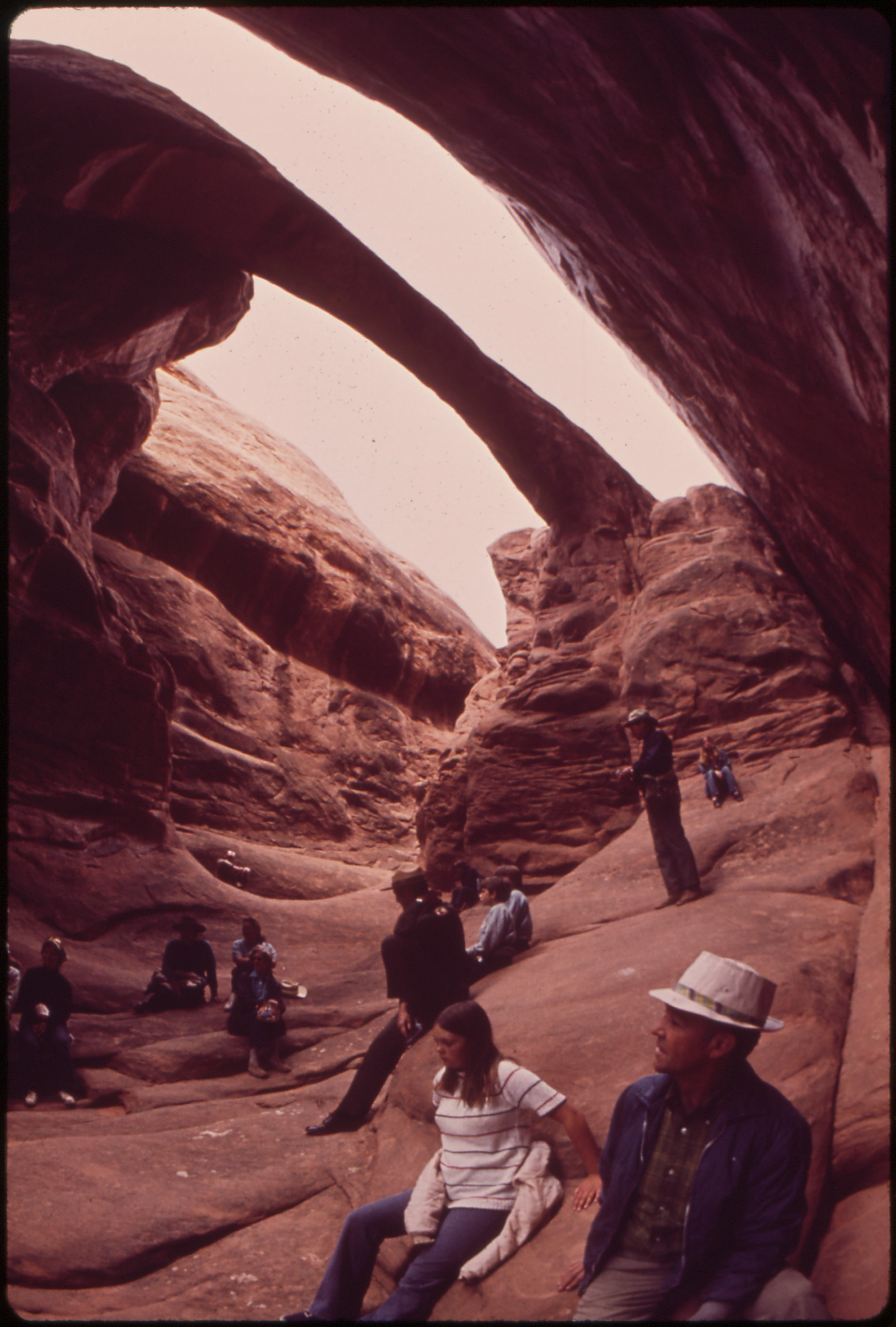
Surprise Arch with tour guide

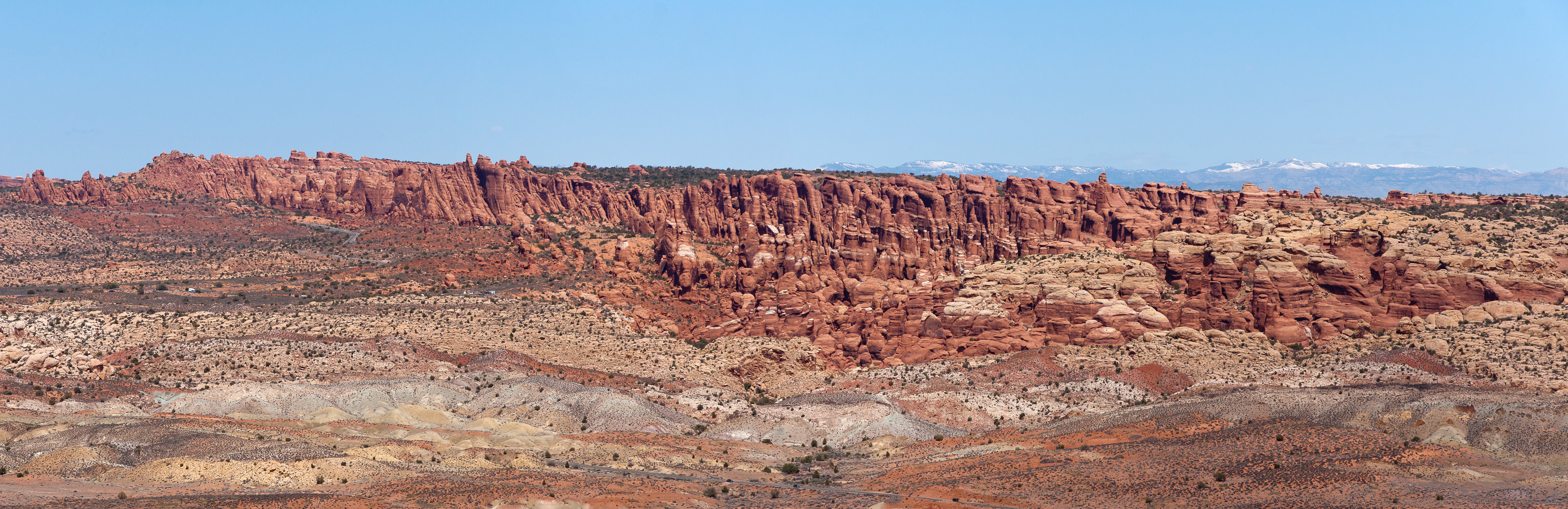
Panorama
