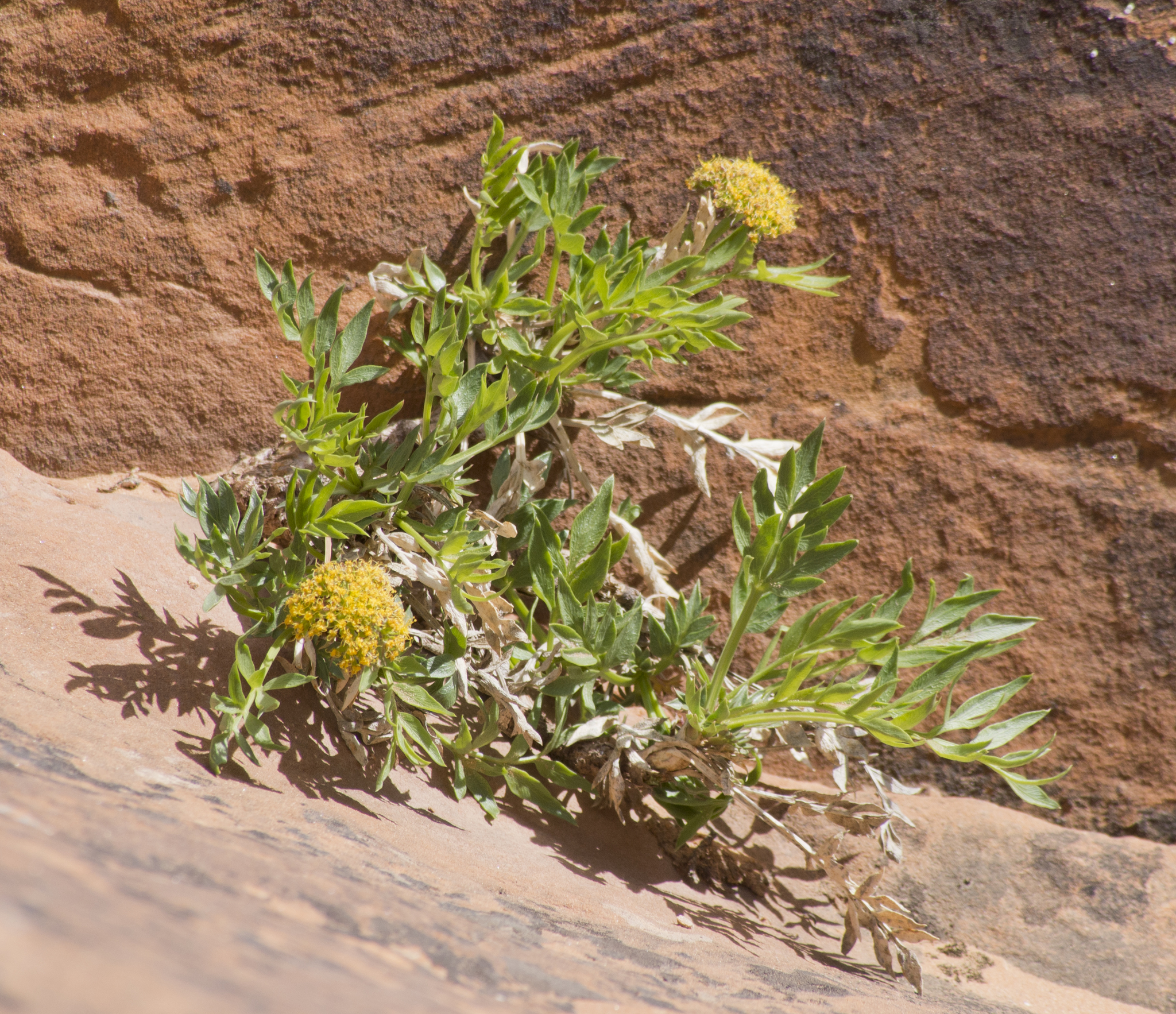
- In Grand County, Utah

Conservation status
- Imperiled (NatureServe)

Scientific classification
- Kingdom: Plantae
- Clade: Tracheophytes
- Clade: Angiosperms
- Clade: Eudicots
- Clade: Asterids
- Order: Apiales
- Family: Apiaceae
- Genus: Lomatium
- Species: L. latilobum

Binomial name
- Lomatium latilobum (Rydb.) Mathias

Synonyms
- Aletes latiloba (Rydb.) W.Weber; Cynomarathrum latilobum Rydb.

= Lomatium latilobum =

Plant species in the parsley family

Lomatium latilobum is a threatened species of flowering plant in the carrot family, known by the common names Canyonlands lomatium and Canyonlands biscuitroot. It is native to an area straddling the border between Utah and Colorado in the United States, where several of its few occurrences are within Arches National Park and Colorado National Monument.

== Description ==
This perennial herb usually grows 10 to 30 centimeters tall, but can on occasion be just 6 cm tall, sprouting from a caudex covered in the withered remains of previous seasons' leaves. The caudex sits atop a broad taproot and produces large clumps of leaves in many clusters, all parts of the plants hairless or only slightly covered in a grainy to rough texture. The leaves are divided into a few pairs of lance-shaped or oval leaflets up to 1.2 centimeters wide. The inflorescence is an umbel of many tiny yellow flowers. Blooming occurs in April through June. The plant has a strong scent reminiscent of lemon and licorice.

== Taxonomy ==
In 1913 the botanist Per Axel Rydberg described a new species in the genus Cynomarathrum which he named Cynomarathrum latilobum. In 1937 Mildred Esther Mathias moved the species to the genus Lomatium creating the accepted name Lomatium latilobum. Together with its genus it is classified in the Apiaceae family. It has one other homotypic synonym from when Wilhelm Weber proposed moving it to Aletes as Aletes latiloba in 1984. Rydberg collected the type specimen of the species together with Albert Osbun Garrett near Wilson Mesa in Grand County, Utah.

== Range and habitat ==
Lomatium latilobum is a narrow endemic of the Colorado Plateau very often found in Arches National Park and Colorado National Monument. This plant grows in sandy crevices in Entrada Sandstone, Navajo Sandstone, where the Chinle Formation contacts Wingate Sandstone, and other sandstones. The habitat is pinyon-juniper woodland, desert scrub, and other types of plant communities.

There are 21 known populations of this plant, 19 documented in Utah as of 2020 and 6 in Colorado as of 2023. There are also populations in the Manti–La Sal National Forest, Black Ridge Canyons Wilderness Area, and Colorado Canyons National Conservation Area. Some are officially protected within national park and national monument territory, but still face threats from people engaging in recreational activity such as hiking; the plants do not tolerate disturbance and are easily uprooted.
