= Alvania acida =

Scientific classification
- Kingdom: Animalia
- Phylum: Mollusca
- Class: Gastropoda
- Subclass: Caenogastropoda
- Order: Littorinimorpha
- Family: Rissoidae
- Genus: Alvania
- Species: A. acida

Binomial name
- Alvania acida Garilli, Reitano & Scuderi, 2023

Species of gastropod

Alvania acida is a species of minute sea snail, a marine gastropod mollusk or micromollusk in the family Rissoidae.

== Distribution ==
This species occurs in the Mediterranean Sea off Vulcano Island, Sicily, Italy.
