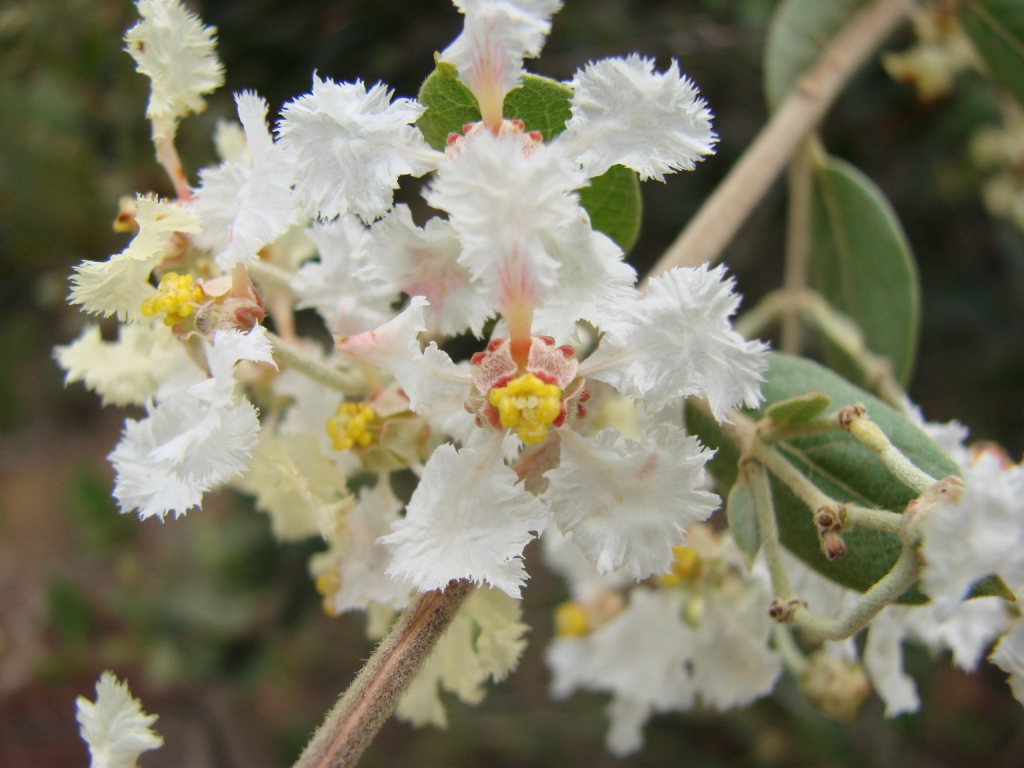
- Banisteriopsis campestris

Scientific classification
- Kingdom: Plantae
- Clade: Tracheophytes
- Clade: Angiosperms
- Clade: Eudicots
- Clade: Rosids
- Order: Malpighiales
- Family: Malpighiaceae
- Genus: Banisteriopsis; C.B.Rob. ex Small

Species
- 65, see text

= Banisteriopsis =

Genus of flowering plants

Banisteriopsis is a genus of flowering plants in the family Malpighiaceae. There are about 65 species which range from northeastern Mexico and Cuba through Central and South America to northern Argentina. Most are native to Brazil, Bolivia, Colombia, Ecuador, and Peru.

One well-known species is Banisteriopsis caapi, the source of ayahuasca.

== Species ==
65 species are accepted.

- Banisteriopsis acerosa (Nied.) B.Gates
- Banisteriopsis adenopoda (A.Juss.) B.Gates
- Banisteriopsis alternifolia (Steyerm.) B.Gates
- Banisteriopsis andersonii B.Gates
- Banisteriopsis angustifolia (A.Juss.) B.Gates
- Banisteriopsis anisandra (A.Juss.) B.Gates
- Banisteriopsis appressa (B.Gates) R.F.Almeida & M.Pell.
- Banisteriopsis arborea B.Gates
- Banisteriopsis argyrophylla (A.Juss.) B.Gates
- Banisteriopsis basifixa B.Gates
- Banisteriopsis byssacea B.Gates
- Banisteriopsis caapi (Spruce ex Griseb.) C.V.Morton
- Banisteriopsis calcicola B.Gates
- Banisteriopsis campestris (A.Juss.) Little
- Banisteriopsis carolina W.R.Anderson
- Banisteriopsis cipoensis B.Gates
- Banisteriopsis confusa B.Gates
- Banisteriopsis elegans (Triana & Planch.) Sandwith
- Banisteriopsis gardneriana (A.Juss.) W.R.Anderson & B.Gates
- Banisteriopsis glabrata (B.Gates) R.F.Almeida & M.Pell.
- Banisteriopsis goiana B.Gates
- Banisteriopsis grandifolia (Nied.) B.Gates
- Banisteriopsis harleyi B.Gates
- Banisteriopsis hatschbachii B.Gates
- Banisteriopsis hirsuta B.Gates
- Banisteriopsis irwinii B.Gates
- Banisteriopsis laevifolia (A.Juss.) B.Gates
- Banisteriopsis latifolia (A.Juss.) B.Gates
- Banisteriopsis lyrata B.Gates
- Banisteriopsis macedae W.R.Anderson
- Banisteriopsis magdalenensis B.Gates
- Banisteriopsis maguirei B.Gates
- Banisteriopsis malifolia (Nees & Mart.) B.Gates
- Banisteriopsis martiniana (A.Juss.) Cuatrec.
- Banisteriopsis megaphylla (A.Juss.) B.Gates
- Banisteriopsis membranifolia (A.Juss.) B.Gates
- Banisteriopsis multifoliolata (A.Juss.) B.Gates
- Banisteriopsis muricata (Cav.) Cuatrec.
- Banisteriopsis nummifera (A.Juss.) B.Gates
- Banisteriopsis oxyclada (A.Juss.) B.Gates
- Banisteriopsis padifolia (Poepp. ex Nied.) B.Gates
- Banisteriopsis paraguariensis B.Gates
- Banisteriopsis parviflora (A.Juss.) B.Gates
- Banisteriopsis parviglandula B.Gates
- Banisteriopsis pauciflora (Kunth) C.B.Rob.
- Banisteriopsis polygama (Nied.) B.Gates
- Banisteriopsis prancei B.Gates
- Banisteriopsis pseudojanusia (Nied.) B.Gates
- Banisteriopsis pubescens (Nied.) Cuatrec.
- Banisteriopsis pulcherrima (Sandwith) B.Gates
- Banisteriopsis pulchra B.Gates
- Banisteriopsis quadriglandula B.Gates
- Banisteriopsis rostrata W.R.Anderson
- Banisteriopsis salicifolia (DC.) B.Gates
- Banisteriopsis schizoptera (A.Juss.) B.Gates
- Banisteriopsis schwannioides (Griseb.) B.Gates
- Banisteriopsis scutellata (Griseb.) B.Gates
- Banisteriopsis sellowiana (A.Juss.) B.Gates
- Banisteriopsis stellaris (Griseb.) B.Gates
- Banisteriopsis subenervia (Cuatrec.) R.F.Almeida & M.Pell.
- Banisteriopsis variabilis B.Gates
- Banisteriopsis velutinissima B.Gates
- Banisteriopsis vernoniifolia (Mart. ex A.Juss.) B.Gates
- Banisteriopsis whitei Rusby
- Banisteriopsis wilburii B.Gates

== Legal status ==
=== United States ===
==== Louisiana ====
Except for ornamental purposes, growing, selling or possessing Banisteriopsis spp. is prohibited by Louisiana State Act 159.
