= Somayajna =

Hindu ritual

The Somayajna (Sanskrit: सोमयज्ञ, romanized: Somayajña) or Somayaga (ISO: Sōmayāga) or Soma sacrifice is a Hindu ritual. It is a type of Yajna associated with the lunar cycle, and regarded to be performed for the maintenance of the cosmic order.

This ritual is based on methods described in the Vedas. Soma is used as the main offering in this Yajna, regarded to be able to propitiate deities. It is prescribed to be performed only by the Brahmanas. A priest who performs this Yajna is termed as a Somayaji.

== Types ==
The seven types of Somayajna are:

- Agniṣṭoma – The first and main type, the six others are considered variations of this
- Uktya
- Ṣoḍaśī
- Atyagniṣṭoma
- Atirātra
- Āptoryāma
- Vājapeya

== See also ==
- Vedas
- Yajna
