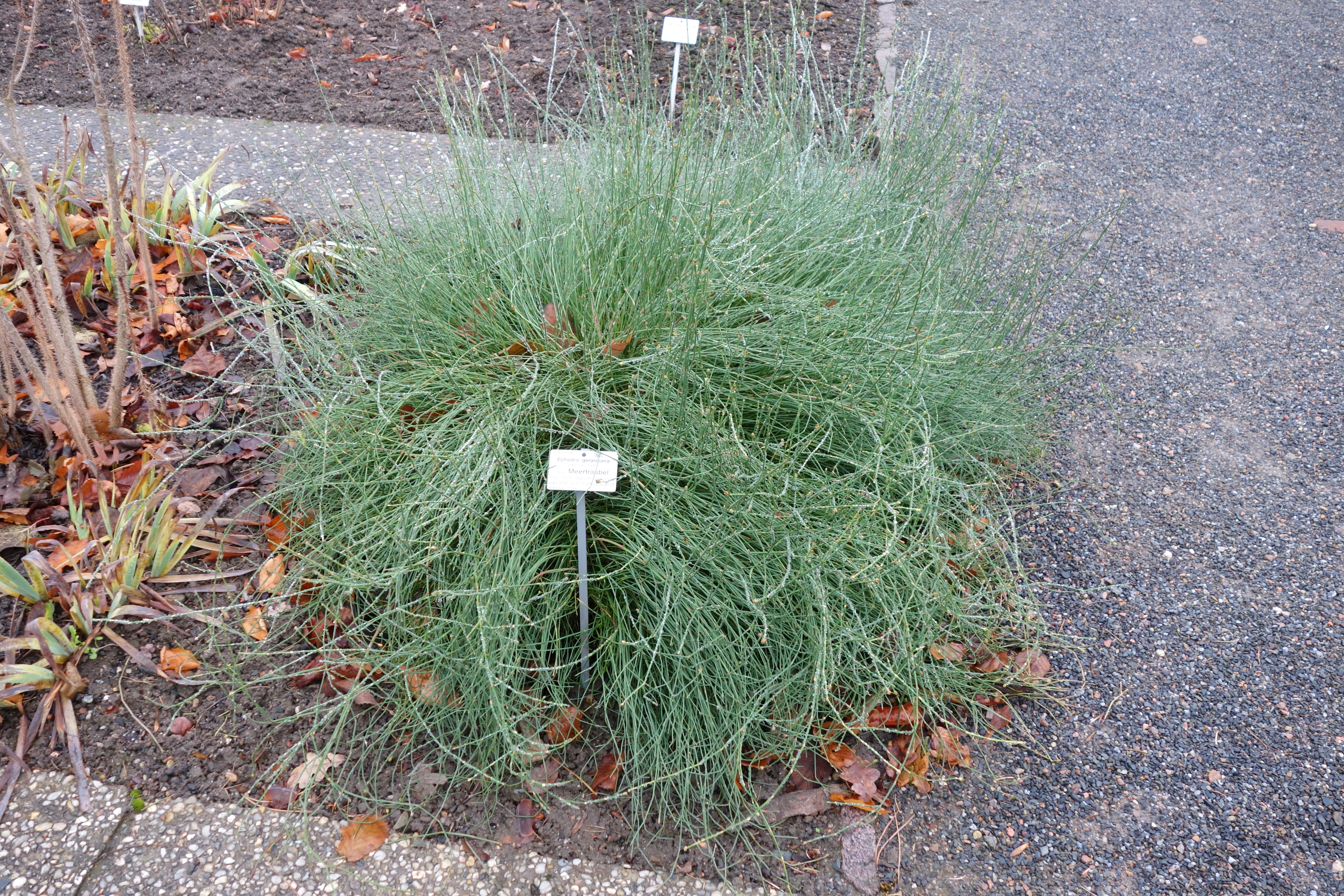

Scientific classification
- Kingdom: Plantae
- Clade: Tracheophytes
- Clade: Gymnosperms
- Division: Pinophyta
- Class: Pinopsida
- Subclass: Gnetidae
- Order: Ephedrales
- Family: Ephedraceae
- Genus: Ephedra
- Species: E. gerardiana

Binomial name
- Ephedra gerardiana Wallich ex C. A. Meyer

= Ephedra gerardiana =

Species of seed-bearing shrub

Ephedra gerardiana (Gerard's jointfir, 山岭麻黄 shan ling ma huang) is a species of Ephedra, endemic to the mountains of Afghanistan, Bhutan, Northern India, Nepal, Pakistan, Sikkim, Tajikistan, and Tibet. It is a perennial small shrub composed primarily of fibrous stalks, generally about 8 inches though sometimes growing to 24 inches in height, with small, yellow flowers followed by round, red, edible fruits. It is sometimes used as a stimulant, and in Ayurvedic medicine its tea is used as medicine for colds, coughs, bronchitis, asthma, and arthritis.
