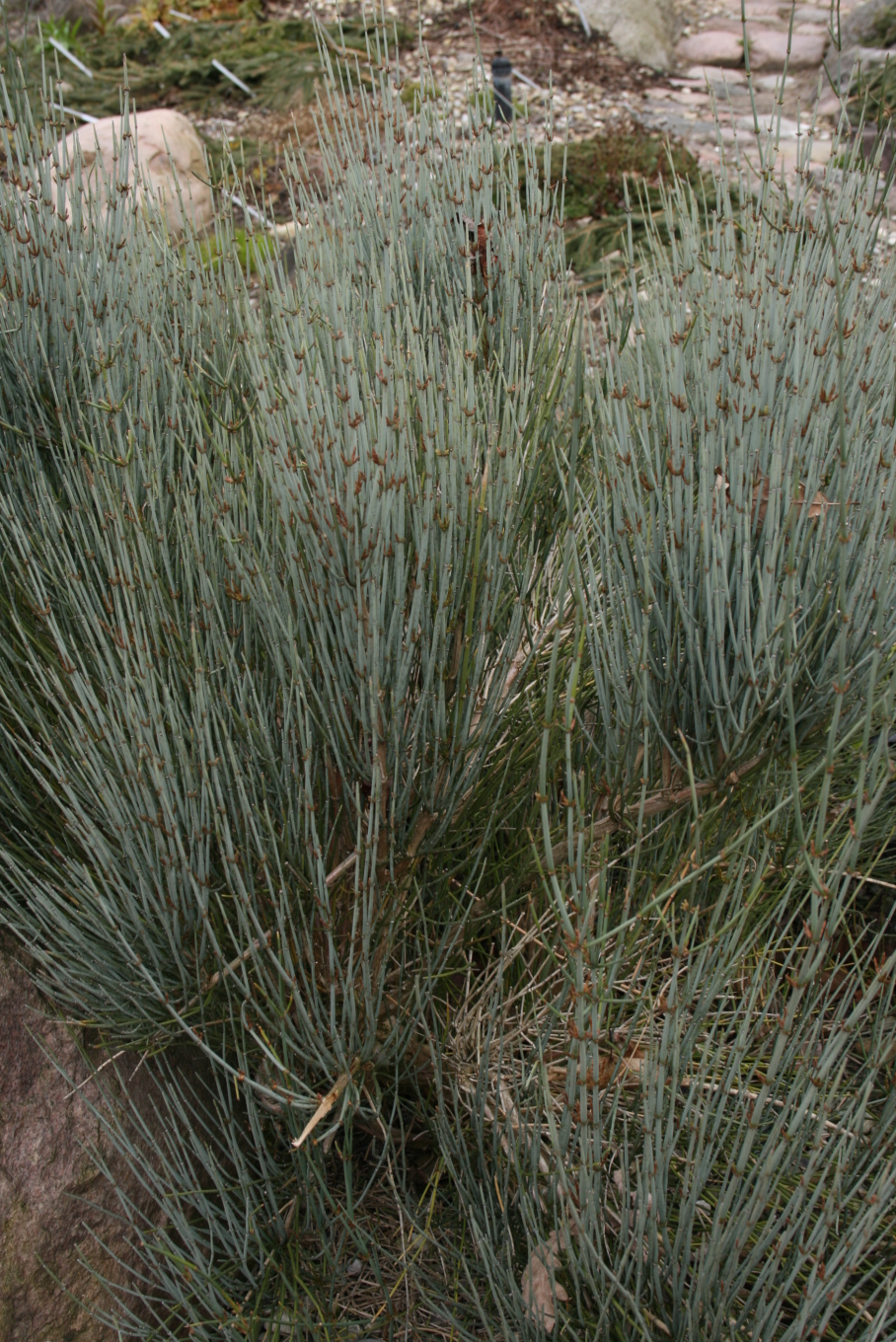
- Ephedra intermedia
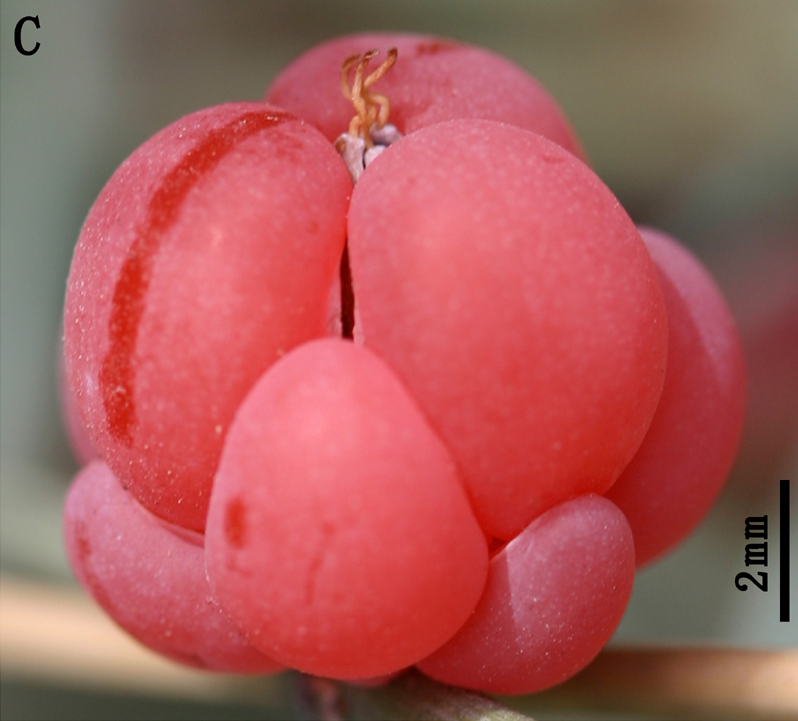
- Female cone

Scientific classification
- Kingdom: Plantae
- Clade: Tracheophytes
- Clade: Gymnospermae
- Division: Gnetophyta
- Class: Gnetopsida
- Order: Ephedrales
- Family: Ephedraceae
- Genus: Ephedra
- Species: E. intermedia

Binomial name
- Ephedra intermedia Schrenk & C.A.Mey.

Synonyms
- Ephedra ferganensis V.A.Nikitin; Ephedra microsperma V.A.Nikitin; Ephedra persica (Stapf) V.A.Nikitin; Ephedra tesquorum V.A.Nikitin; Ephedra tibetica (Stapf) V.A.Nikitin; Ephedra valida V.A.Nikitin

= Ephedra intermedia =

Species of seed-bearing shrub

Ephedra intermedia, with the Chinese common name of Zhong Ma Huang, is a species of Ephedra that is native to Siberia, Central Asia, Iran, Afghanistan, Pakistan, the western Himalayas, Tibet, Mongolia, and China.

== Description ==
Ephedra intermedia is found in deserts, grasslands, floodlands and river valleys, slopes and cliffs, and sandy beaches. It grows at elevations of 100–4,600 metres (330–15,090 ft), in rocky or sandy dry habitats.

The plant grows to 1 metre (3.3 ft) tall. The strobili are dioecious, either male or female on any one plant, so both male and female plants are needed for seeds.

== Taxonomy ==
It was originally described by Alexander Gustav von Schrenk and Carl Anton von Meyer in 1846. It was placed in section Pseudobaccatae (=sect. Ephedra sect. Ephedra), "tribe" Pachycladae by Otto Stapf in 1889.

In 1996 Robert A. Price classified E. intermedia in section Ephedra without recognizing a tribe.
