= C15H14O4 =

The molecular formula C_{15}H_{14}O_{4} may refer to:

- O-Desmethylangolensin, a phytoestrogen
- Braylin, a coumarin
- Gnetucleistol D, a stilbenoid
- Guibourtinidol, a flavan-3ol
- Isorhapontigenin, a stilbenoid
- Lunularic acid, a dihydrostilbenoid
- Plicatol C, a phenanthrene
- Rhapontigenin, a stilbenoid
- Yangonin, a kavalactone
- Lomatiol, a quinone pigment found in flowering plants
