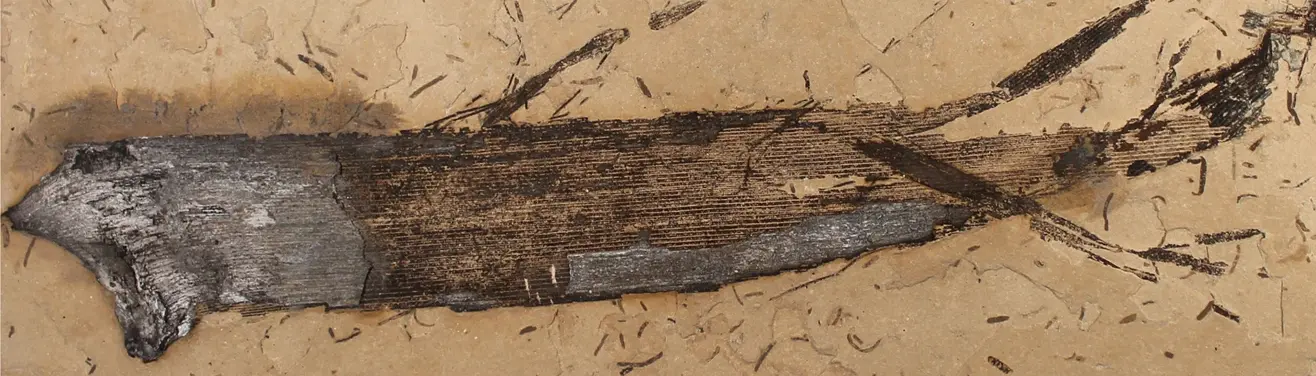
- Leaf fossil

Scientific classification
- Kingdom: Plantae
- Clade: Tracheophytes
- Clade: Gymnosperms
- Division: Pinophyta
- Class: Pinopsida
- Subclass: Gnetidae
- Order: Welwitschiales
- Family: Welwitschiaceae
- Genus: †Welwitschiophyllum; Dilcher, Bernardes-de-Oliveira, Pons et Lott, 2005
- Species: †W. brasiliense

Binomial name
- †Welwitschiophyllum brasiliense Dilcher, Bernardes-de-Oliveira, Pons et Lott, 2005

= Welwitschiophyllum =

Welwitschiophyllum Temporal range: Early Cretaceous (late Aptian) 114–112 Ma

Extinct plant genus

Welwitschiophyllum (lit. 'Welwitschia leaf') is an extinct genus of plant in the family Welwitschiaceae known from the Early Cretaceous Crato Formation of Brazil. A probable occurrence of this genus has also been reported from the Late Cretaceous Akrabou Formation of southeast Morocco, extending its known range from South America to Africa and suggesting phytogeographical links between equatorial Gondwana landmasses. It appears to have been adapted for drought resistance, as it possesses regular pitted structures on the convex sides of its leaves which are morphologically similar to Stomatal crypts. Welwitschiophyllum was the first plant with preserved gum identified in the fossil record. Welwitschiophyllum is one of a small number of known megafossil genera attributed to the Gnetales, a gymonsperm group with a fossil record extending back to the Permian era.
