= C16H16O4 =

The molecular formula C_{16}H_{16}O_{4} (molar mass: 272.29 g/mol, exact mass: 272.104859 u) may refer to:

- Gnetucleistol E
- 1,6-Bis(2,3-epoxypropoxy)naphthalene
