= Gnetum cleistostachyum =

Scientific classification
- Kingdom: Plantae
- Clade: Tracheophytes
- Clade: Gymnospermae
- Division: Gnetophyta
- Order: Gnetales
- Family: Gnetaceae
- Genus: Gnetum
- Species: G. cleistostachyum

Binomial name
- Gnetum cleistostachyum C.Y.Cheng

Species of seed-bearing plant

Gnetum cleistostachyum is a liana species in the Sessiles subsection of the genus Gnetum described from South East Yunnan.

The name is still invalid and efloras states it is advisable to postpone validating it until more complete collections, particularly with seeds, can be studied.

The stilbene derivatives, gnetucleistol A, B and C, gnetifolin A, p-hydroxycinnamic acid, piceatannol, resveratrol, bisisorhapontigenin A, gnetuhainin P, gnetulin, the stilbenolignans, gnetucleistol F, gnetofuran A, lehmbachol D, gnetifolin F and gnetumontanin, gnetucleistol D (2-methoxyoxyresveratrol), gnetucleistol E (3-methoxy-isorhapontigenin), rhapontigenin, isorhapontigenin, 4-methoxyresveratrol and pinosylvin can be found in G. cleistostachyum.
