= Drewria =

Scientific classification
- Kingdom: Plantae
- Clade: Tracheophytes
- Clade: Gymnospermae
- Division: Gnetophyta
- Order: Gnetales
- Genus: †Drewria; Crane & Upchurch
- Species: †D. potomacensis

Binomial name
- †Drewria potomacensis Crane & Upchurch

Species of plant from Gnetales order

Drewria potomacensis is a Cretaceous megafossil member of the Gnetales, from the Potomac Group, hence its name. It was possibly a shrub. It is the only known species in the genus Drewria.

== Description ==
Its stems were slender, with opposite and decussate leaves. The leaves were oblong and measured up to 20 millimetres (0.79 in) long. Its reproductive structures consisted of short, loose spikes arranged in dichasial groups of 3.
