= Methoxyresveratrol =

Methoxyresveratrol may refer to:

- 3-Methoxyresveratrol (pinostilbene)
- 4-Methoxyresveratrol
