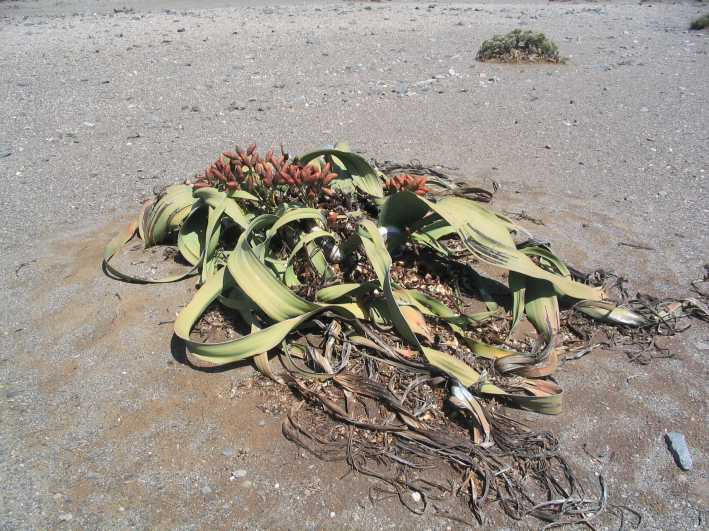
- Welwitschia mirabilis

Scientific classification
- Kingdom: Plantae
- Clade: Embryophytes
- Clade: Tracheophytes
- Clade: Gymnosperms
- Division: Pinophyta
- Class: Pinopsida
- Subclass: Gnetidae
- Order: Welwitschiales; Skottsb. ex Reveal
- Family: Welwitschiaceae; Caruel

Type genus
- Welwitschia Hook.f.

= Welwitschiaceae =

Welwitschiaceae Temporal range: Late Aptian-recent 115–0 Ma

Family of plants

Welwitschiaceae is a family of plants of the order Gnetidae with one living species, Welwitschia mirabilis, found in southwestern Africa. Three fossil genera have been recovered from the Crato Formation – late Aptian (Lower Cretaceous) strata located in the Araripe Basin in northeastern Brazil, with one of these also being known from the early Late Cretaceous (Cenomanian-Turonian) Akrabou Formation of Morocco.

== Taxonomy ==
German naturalist Friedrich Markgraf coined the name Welwitschiaceae in 1926, which appeared in Die Natürlichen Pflanzenfamilien.

Most recent systems place the Welwitschiaceae in the gymnosperm order Gnetales. This order is most closely related to the order Pinales. Genetic analyses indicate that the Gnetales arose from within the conifer group, and any morphological similarities between angiosperms and Gnetales have evolved separately. The ancestors of the extant gymnosperm orders—Gnetales, Coniferales, Cycadales and Ginkgoales—arose during the Late Paleozoic, and became the dominant component of the Late Permian and Mesozoic flora.

== Living species ==
The family contains a single genus and single extant species, Welwitschia mirabilis, which lives in the Kaokoveld Desert of Angola and Namibia in southwestern Africa.

== Fossil species ==
Fossil evidence indicates that members of the Welwitschiaceae were present in South America during the Early Cretaceous (Mesozoic era). Priscowelwitschia austroamericana (initially named Welwitschiella but illegitimate due to the daisy genus Welwitschiella) is a fossil taxon referring to some seedlings with cotyledon leaves. These have many features in common with Welwitschia seedlings. Welwitschiophyllum brasiliense is a taxon known from thick triangular to linear leaves that range from 8.9 to 70 cm long and 2.8–5 cm wide. Welwitschiostrobus murili is a fossil taxon known from some cones that resemble the living Welwitschia, but are longer and thinner.

Jacobson and Lester suggest that these early habitats were more mesic than the current desert conditions, and that the present fragmented and isolated population distribution could be attributed to aridification during the Paleogene, Neogene, and Quaternary, which restricted the plants to locales providing sufficient water for their needs.
