= Stilbenolignan =

Chemical structure of aiphanol, a stilbenolignan

Stilbenolignans are phenolic compounds formed from a stilbenoid and a lignan.

The stilbenolignan aiphanol can be found in the seeds of Aiphanes aculeata. Gnetucleistol F, gnetofuran A, lehmbachol D, gnetifolin F and gnetumontanin can be found in Gnetum cleistostachyum.
