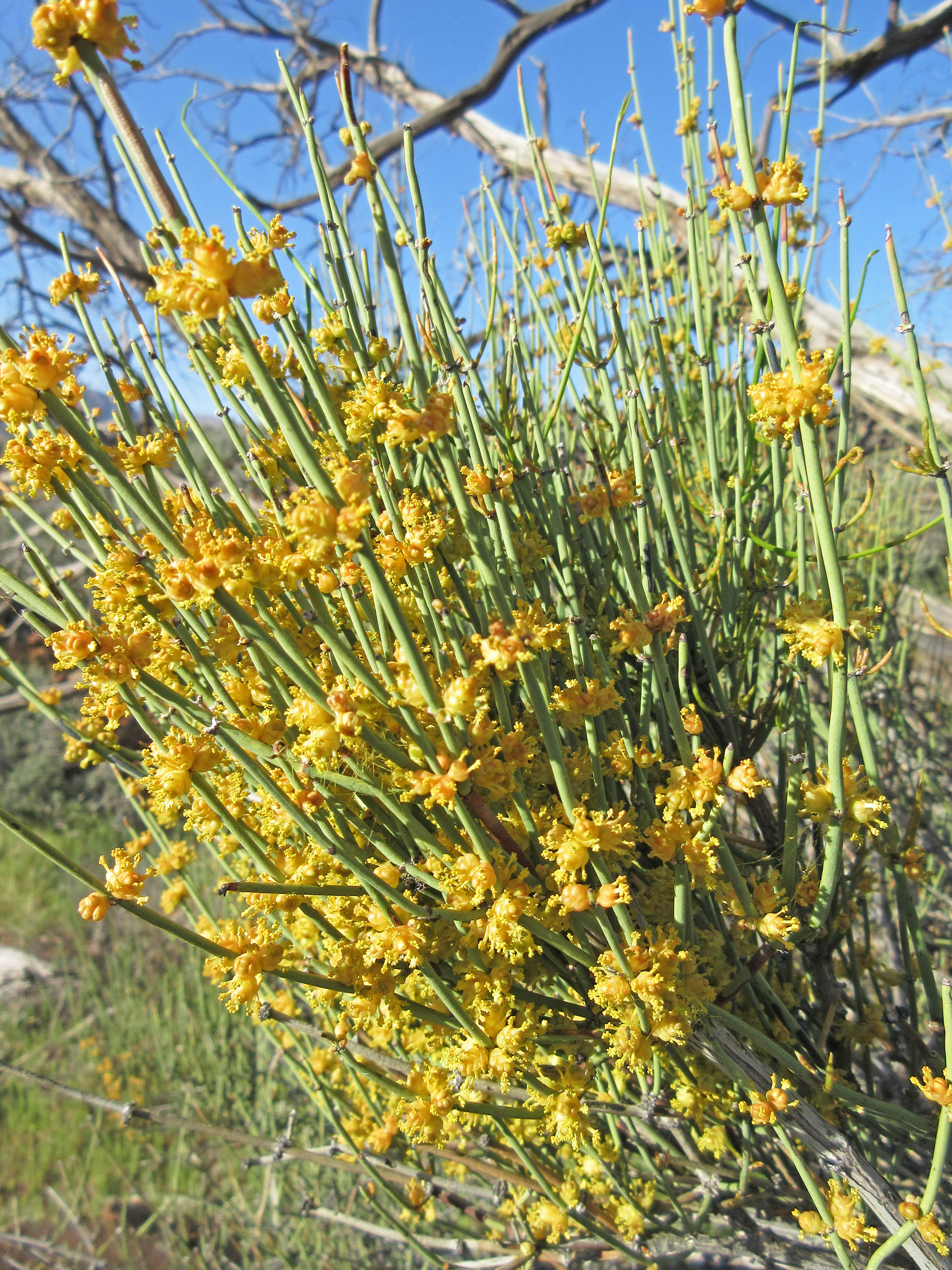
- Ephedra nevadensis
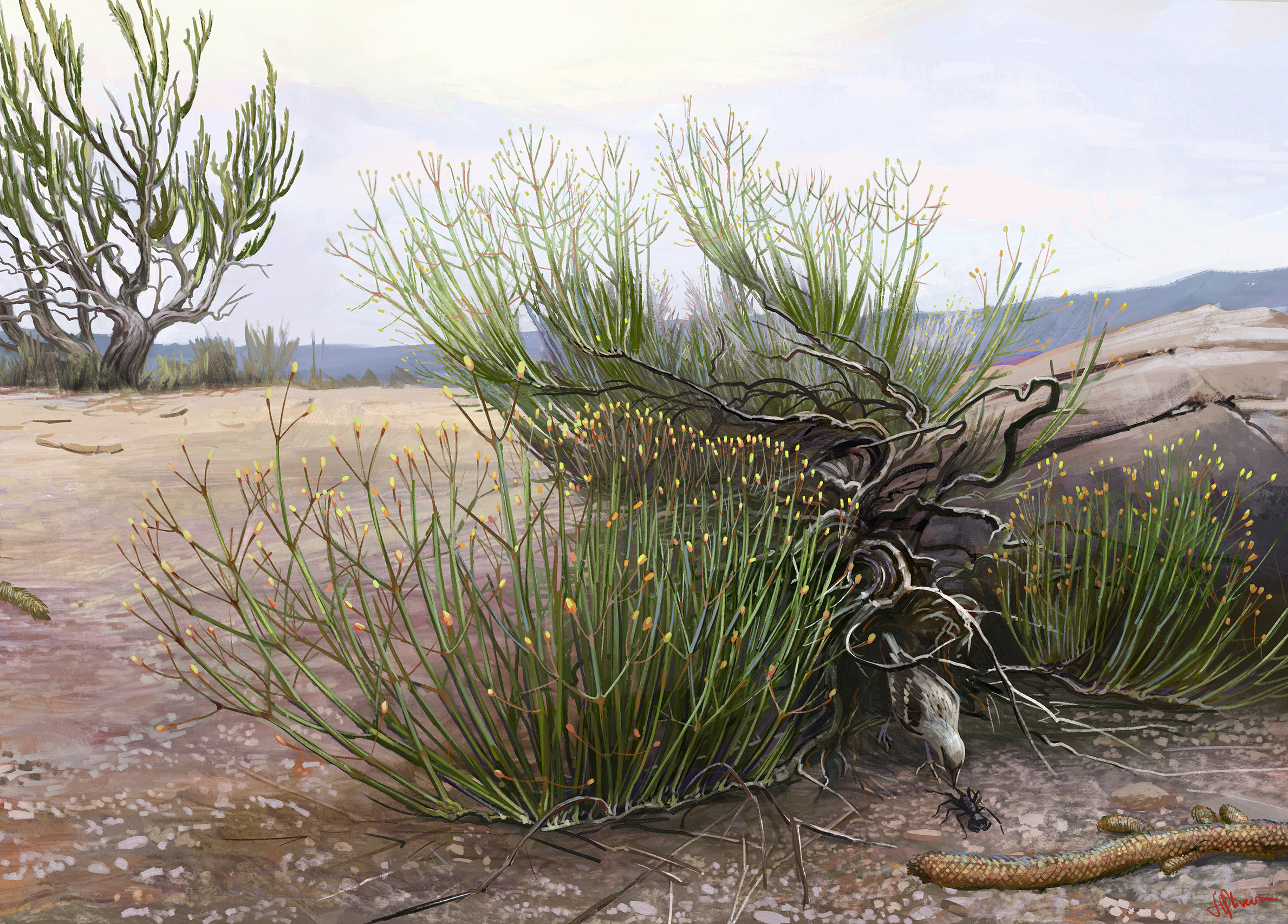
- Restoration of Arlenea from the Early Cretaceous of Brazil

Scientific classification
- Kingdom: Plantae
- Clade: Tracheophytes
- Clade: Gymnosperms
- Division: Pinophyta
- Class: Pinopsida
- Subclass: Gnetidae
- Order: Ephedrales; Dumort.
- Family: Ephedraceae; Dumort.

Type genus
- Ephedra

Other genera
- See text

= Ephedraceae =

Ephedraceae Temporal range: Early Cretaceous–Recent

Family of plants

Ephedraceae is a family of gymnosperms belonging to Gnetidae, it contains only a single extant genus, Ephedra, as well as a number of extinct genera from the Early Cretaceous.

== Taxonomy ==
Fossil Ephedraceae

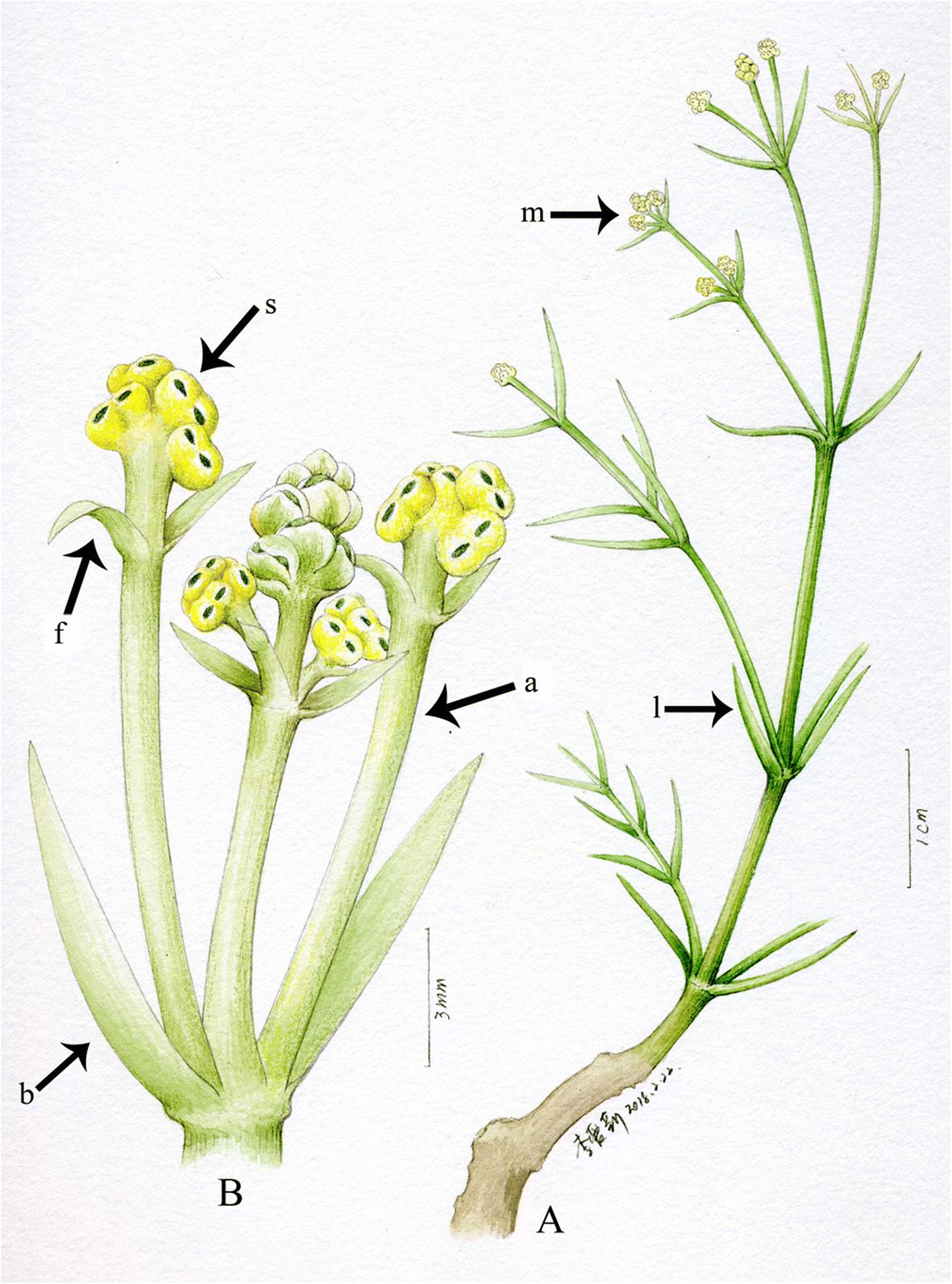
Eamesia, showing male cone (B)

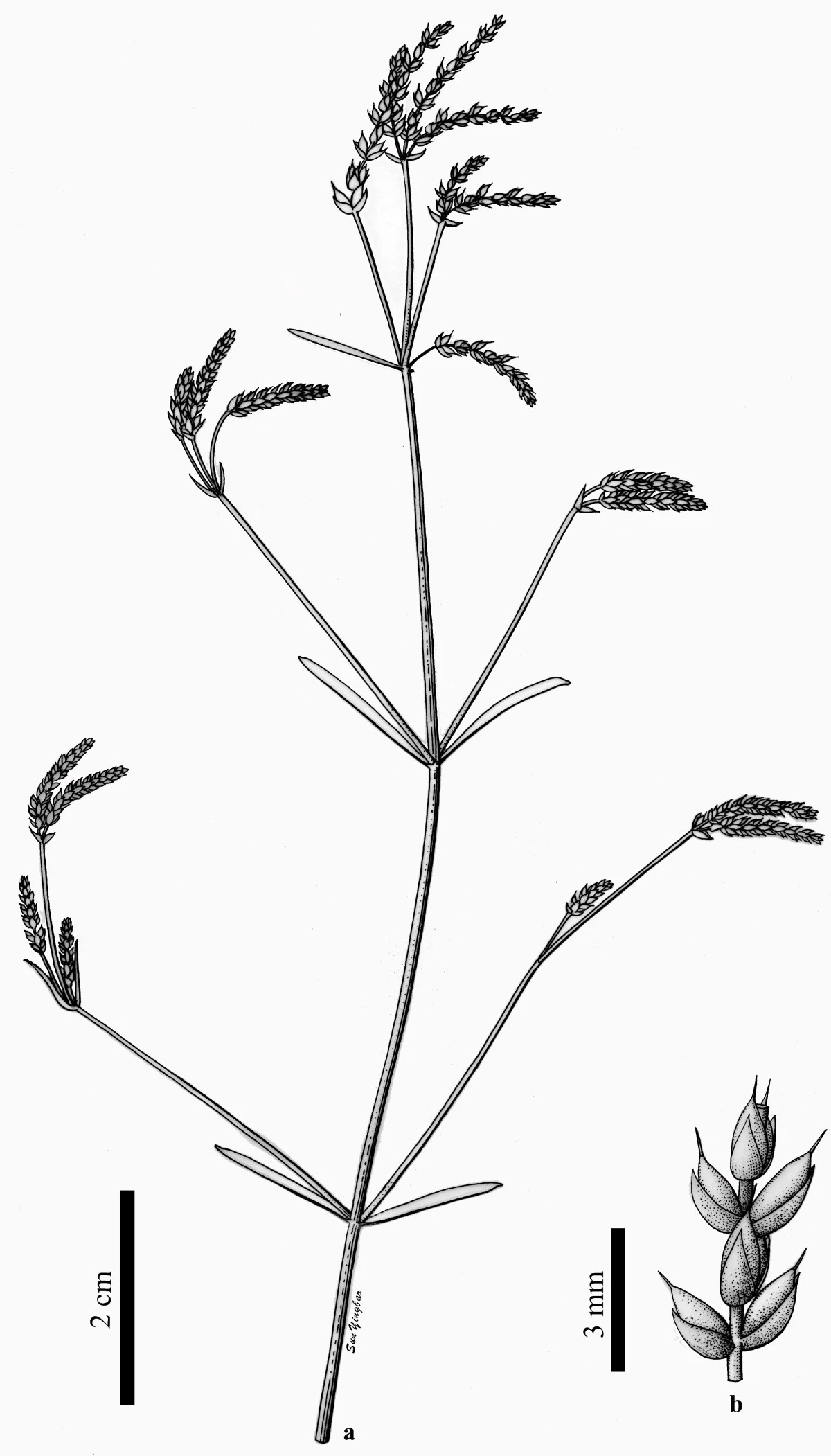
Chengia, showing female reproductive spike (B)

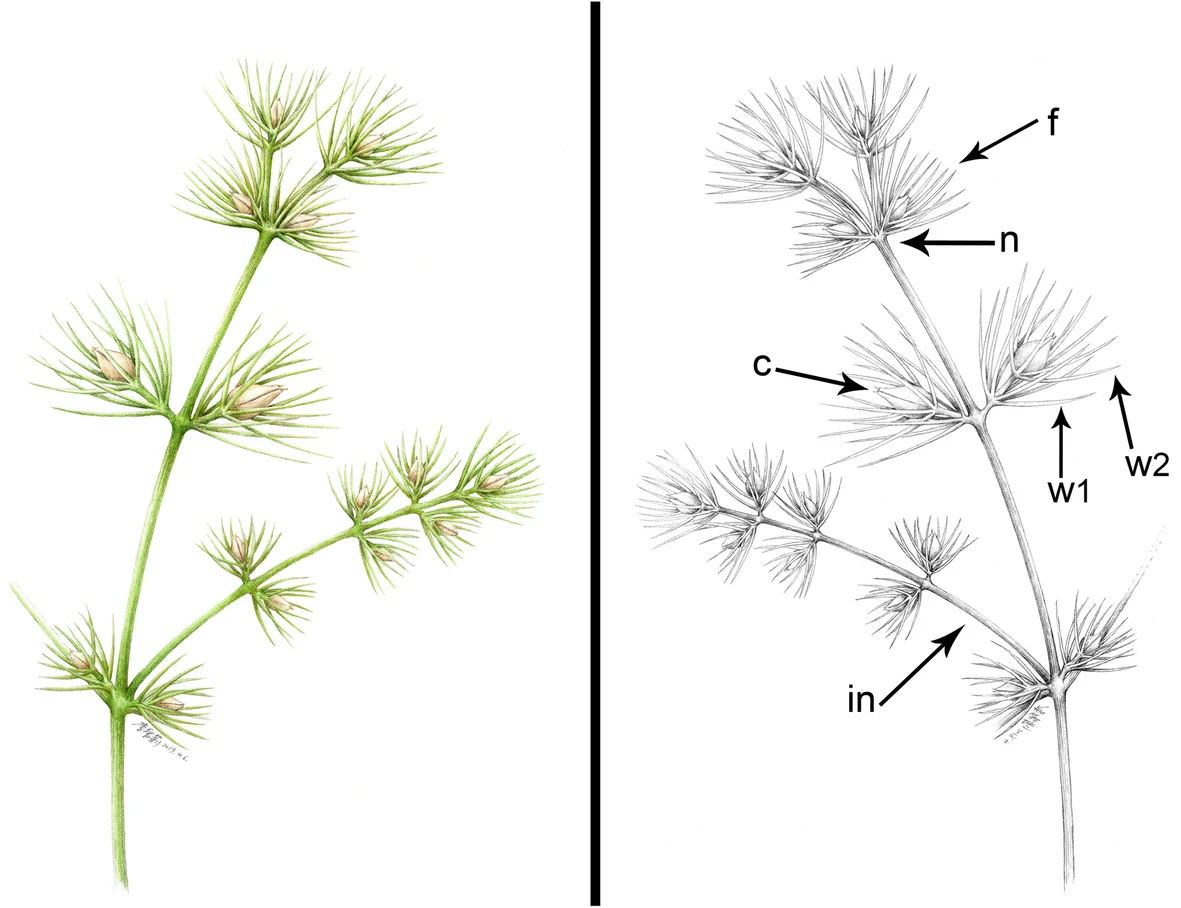
Jianchangia, showing chlamydosperms (C) and ovulate cone (F)

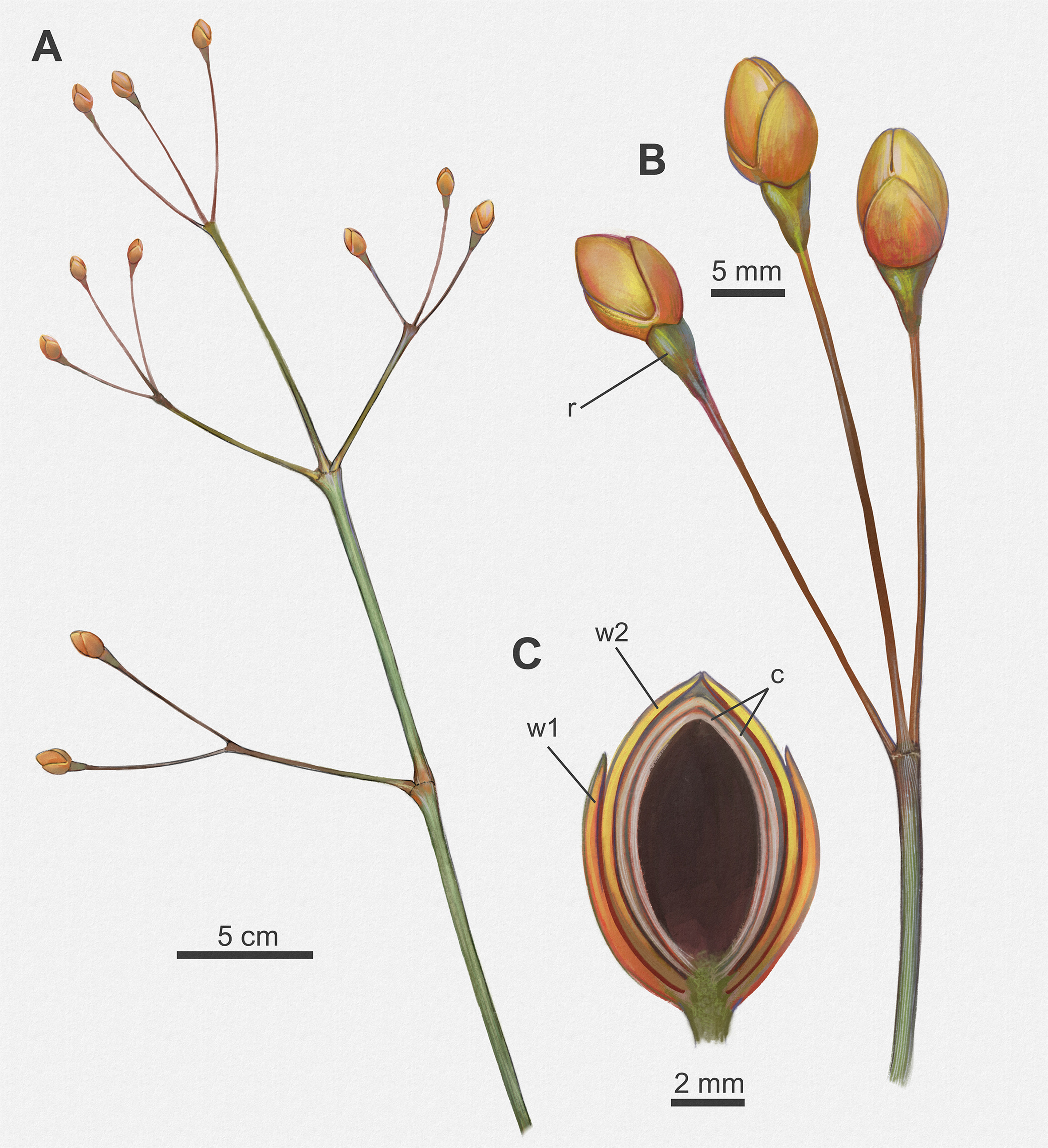
Diagram of Arlenea, showing closeup of terminal region with female reproductive structures (B) and cross section of a female reproductive structure.(C)

Ephedraceae is agreed to be the most basal group amongst extant gnetophytes. Members of the family typically grow as shrubs and have small, linear leaves that possess parallel veins. The fossil Ephedraceae genera show a range of morphologies transitional between the ancestral lax male and female reproductive structures and the highly compact reproductive structures typical of modern Ephedra. Modern members of Ephedra have either dry winged membranous bracts (modified leaves which surround the seed), which are dispersed by wind, leathery covered seeds, which are dispersed by seed-eating rodents, or fleshy bracts which are consumed and then dispersed by birds. Some extinct members of Ephedra from the Early Cretaceous, such as Ephedra carnosa, as well as Arlenea from the Early Cretaceous of Brazil have fleshy bracts surrounding the seeds, suggesting that these seeds were dispersed by animals.

=== Genera ===
- Ephedra L. Early Cretaceous-Recent
- Arlenea Ribeiro, Yang, Saraiva, Bantim, Calixto Junior et Lima, 2023 Crato Formation, Brazil, Early Cretaceous (Aptian)
- Leongathia V.A. Krassilov, D.L. Dilcher & J.G. Douglas 1998 Koonwarra Fossil Bed, Australia, Early Cretaceous (Aptian)
- Jianchangia Yang, Wang and Ferguson, 2020 Jiufotang Formation, China, Early Cretaceous (Aptian)
- Eamesia Yang, Lin and Ferguson, 2018 Yixian Formation, China, Early Cretaceous (Aptian)
- Prognetella Krassilov et Bugdaeva, 1999 Yixian Formation, China, Early Cretaceous (Aptian) (initially interpreted as an angiosperm)
- Chengia Yang, Lin & Wang, 2013, Yixian Formation, China, Early Cretaceous (Aptian)
- Chaoyangia Duan, 1998 Yixian Formation, China, Early Cretaceous (Aptian)
- Eragrosites Cao & Wu, 1998 Yixian Formation, China, Early Cretaceous (Aptian)
- Gurvanella Krassilov, 1982 China, Mongolia, Early Cretaceous
- Alloephedra Tao and Yang, 2003 China, Early Cretaceous (considered a synonym of Ephedra by some authors)
- Amphiephedra Miki, 1964 China, Early Cretaceous
- Beipiaoa Dilcher & al, 2001 China, Early Cretaceous
- Ephedrispermum Rydin, K.R.Pedersen, P.R.Crane et E.M.Friis, 2006 Portugal, Early Cretaceous (Aptian-Albian)
- Ephedrites Guo and Wu, 2000 China, Early Cretaceous
- Erenia Krassilov, 1982 China, Mongolia, Early Cretaceous
- Liaoxia Cao et al. 1998 China, Early Cretaceous
- Dichoephedra Ren et al. 2020 China, Early Cretaceous
- Laiyangia P.H. Jin, 2024 China, Early Cretaceous
- Shangyuania Liu et al 2026 China, Early Cretaceous
- ?Pseudoephedra Liu and Wang, 2015 China, Early Cretaceous
