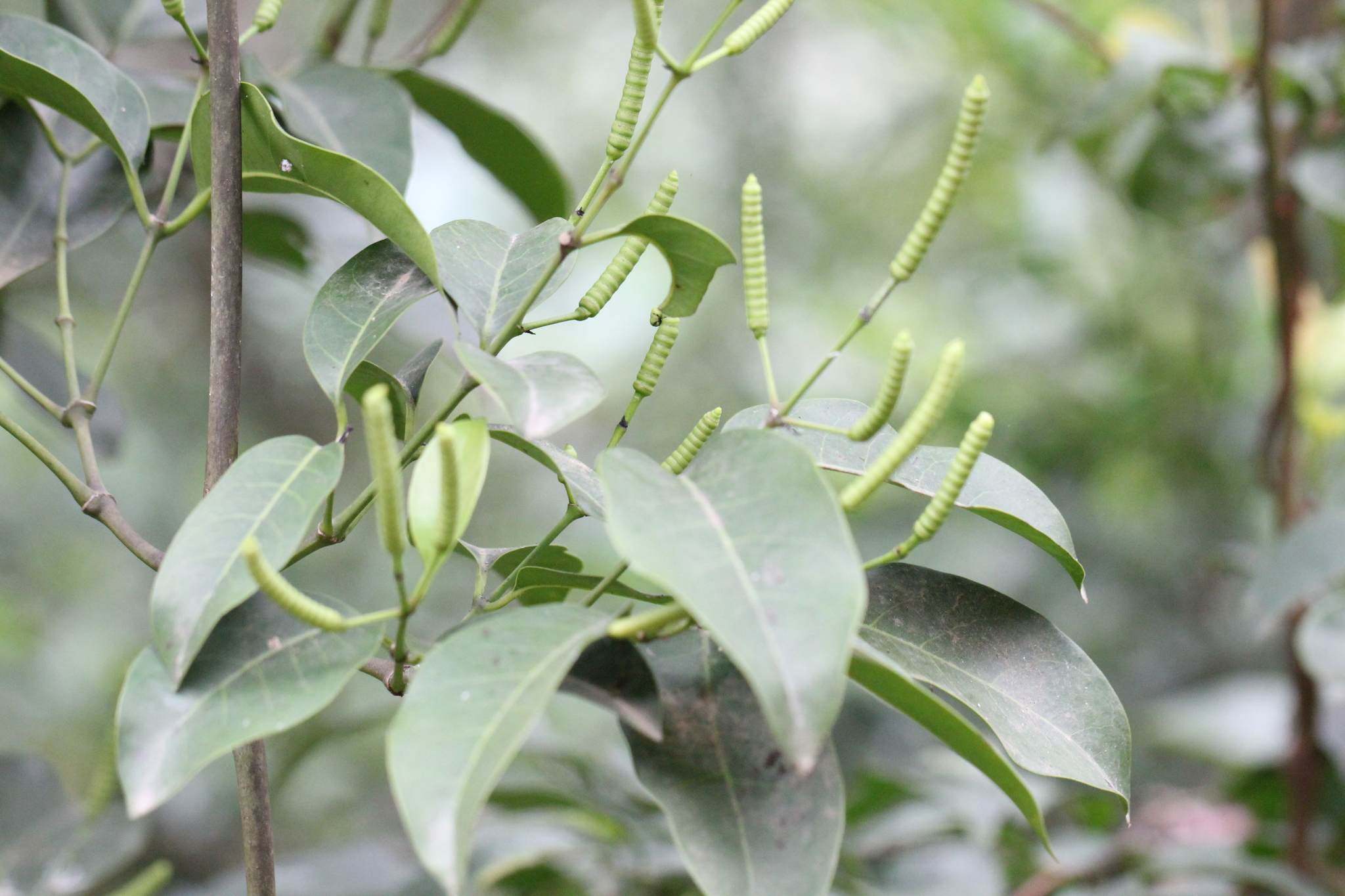
- Gnetum luofuense with female cones
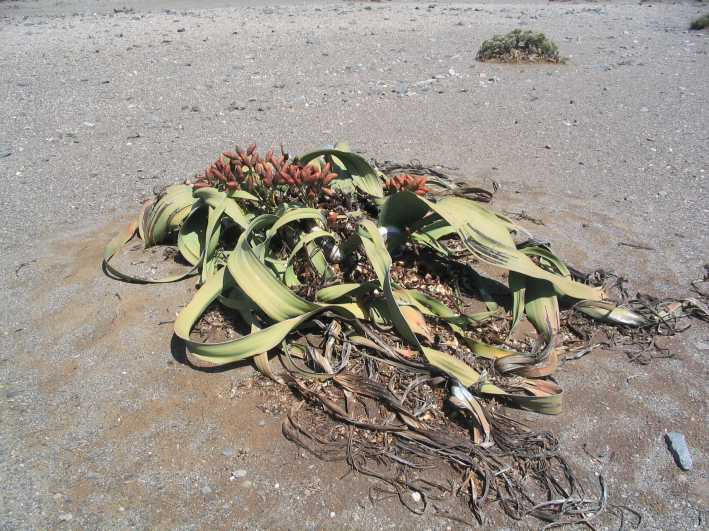
- Welwitschia mirabilis female plant with cones

Scientific classification
- Kingdom: Plantae
- Clade: Tracheophytes
- Clade: Gymnosperms
- Division: Pinophyta
- Class: Pinopsida
- Subclass: Gnetidae; Pax 1894

Orders, families, and genera
- Gnetales; Gnetaceae; Gnetum; Welwitschiales; Welwitschiaceae; Welwitschia; Ephedrales; Ephedraceae; Ephedra
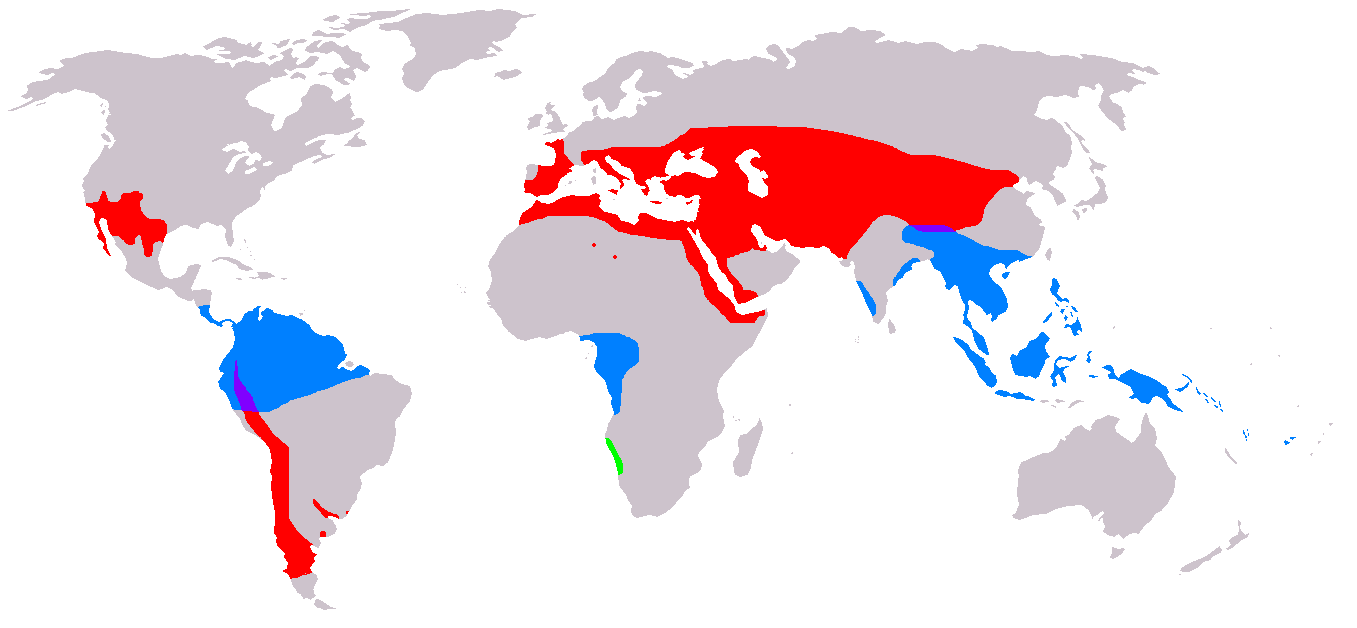
- Distribution, separated by genus: Green – Welwitschia; Blue – Gnetum; Red – Ephedra; Purple – Gnetum and Ephedra

= Gnetidae =

Gnetidae Temporal range: Jurassic–recent

Subclass of plants containing three genera of gymnosperms

Gnetidae, commonly known as gnetophytes, is a subclass of gymnosperms within the class Pinopsida. The group was previously considered the distinct class Gnetopsida within the distinct division Gnetophyta. However, nuclear phylogenomic studies recover gnetophytes as the sister group of the Pinaceae, which means that gnetophytes are nested within Pinopsida; separating them renders Pinopsida paraphyletic. Accordingly, Yang et al. (2022) treat Gnetidae as one of three subclasses of Pinopsida, together with Pinidae and Cupressidae.

The group comprises three morphologically distinct extant genera, each the sole living genus of its family, Ephedra (Ephedraceae), Gnetum (Gnetaceae), and Welwitschia (Welwitschiaceae). It has also been treated as a broadly circumscribed order, Gnetales, though Yang et al. (2022) and WFO Plant List divide Gnetidae into three orders (Ephedrales, Gnetales sensu stricto, and Welwitschiales) each containing a single extant family and genus. Within the subclass, Ephedra is sister to a clade formed by Gnetum and Welwitschia.

The earliest unambiguous fossils attributable to gnetophytes date to the Late Jurassic, and the group reached its greatest known diversity during the Early Cretaceous. Gnetophytes are distinguished from other living gymnosperms by the presence of vessel elements in the secondary xylem. This and other angiosperm-like features once supported hypotheses of a close relationship with flowering plants, but recent phylogenomic analyses indicate that these similarities evolved independently.

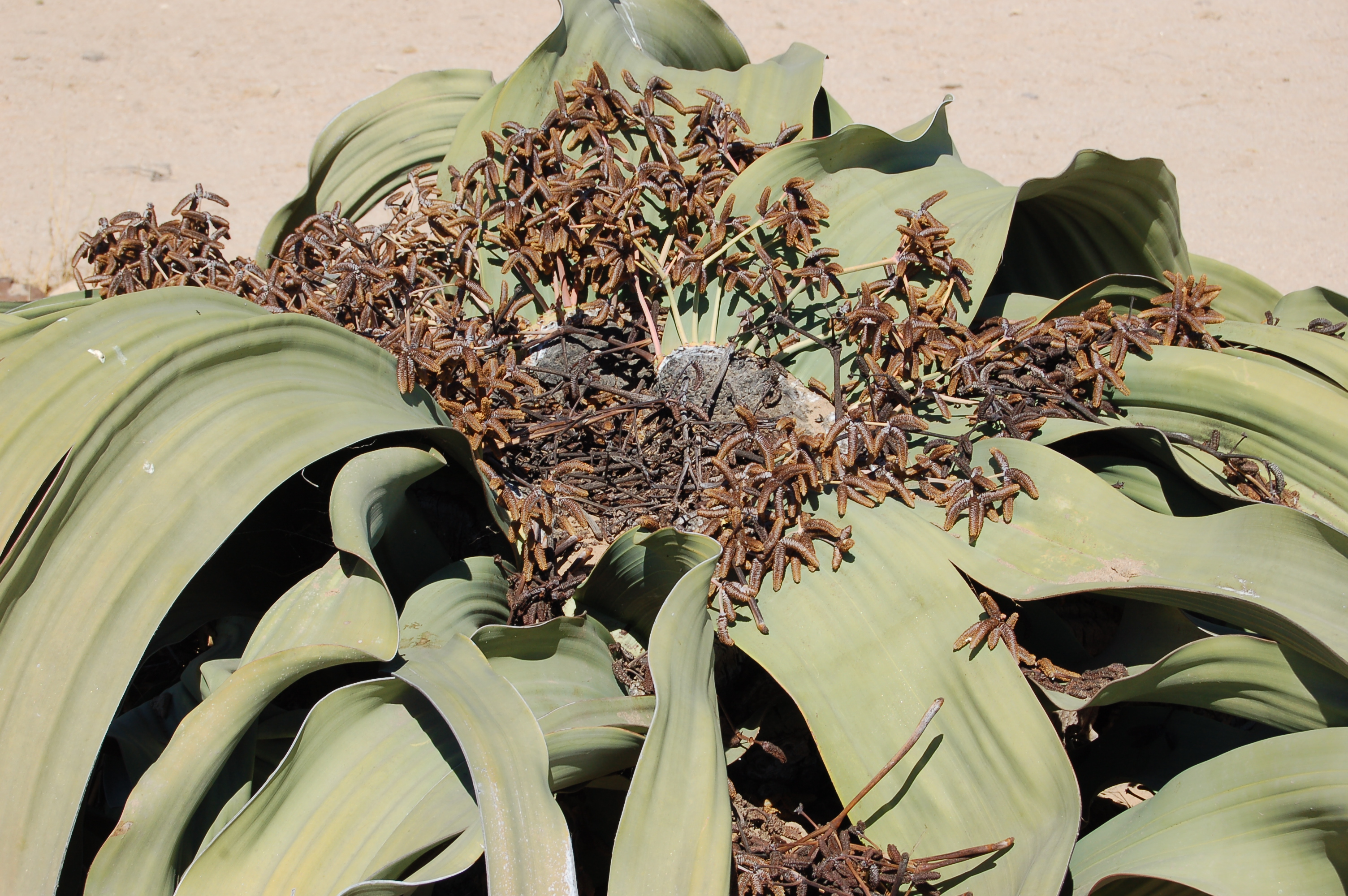
Welwitschia mirabilis bearing male cones

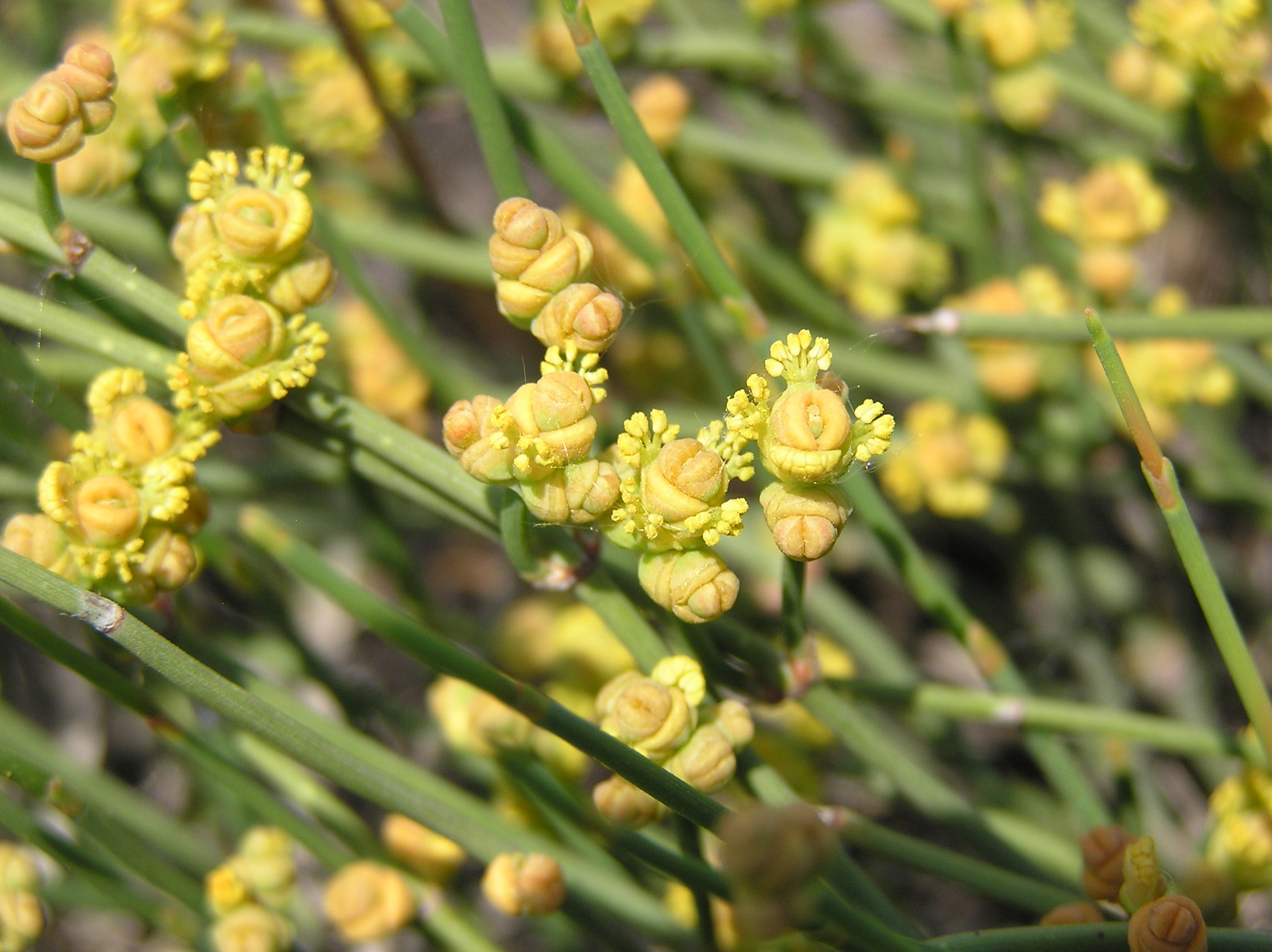
Ephedra distachya (male cones)

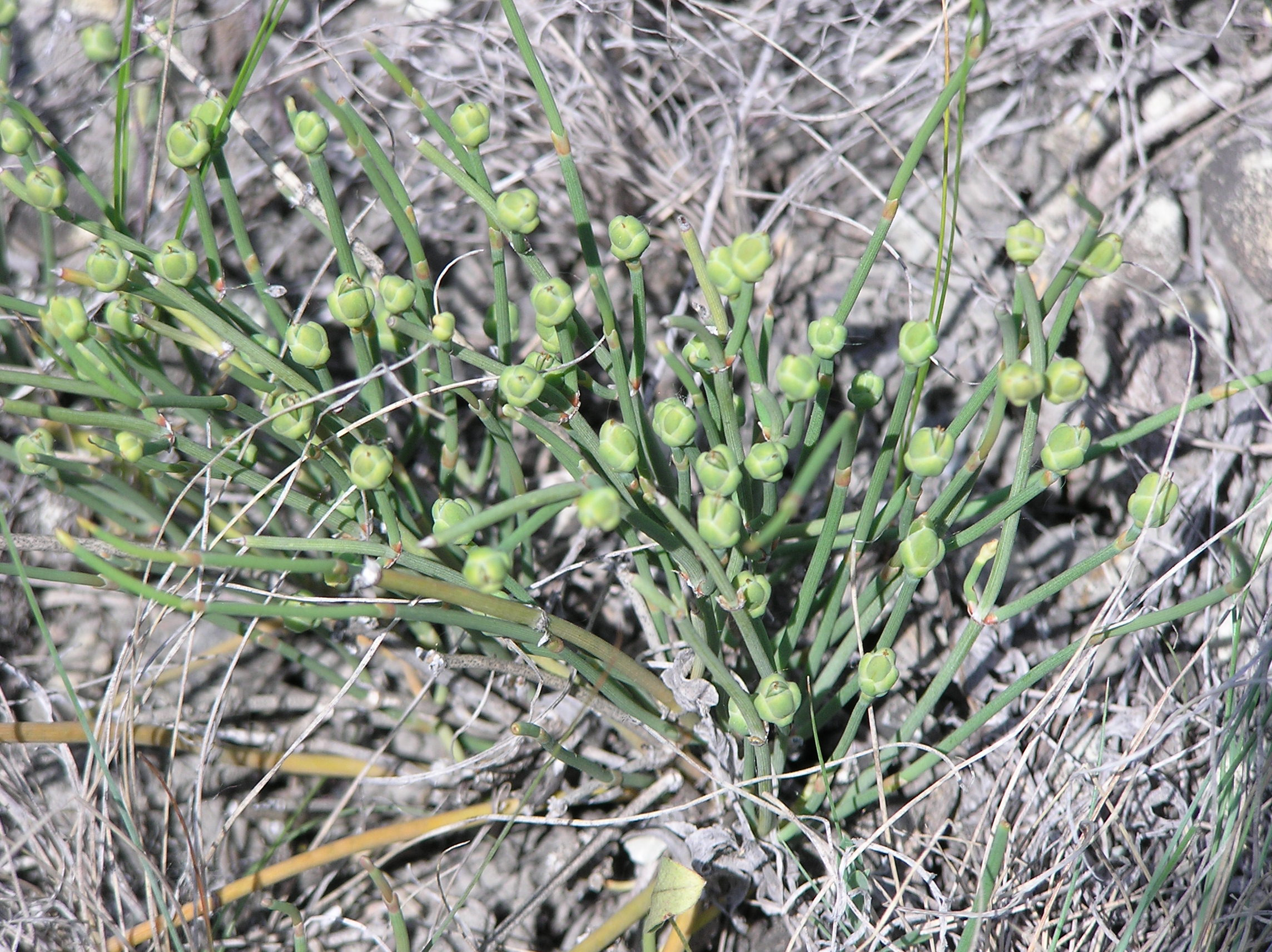
Ephedra distachya (female plant in bloom)

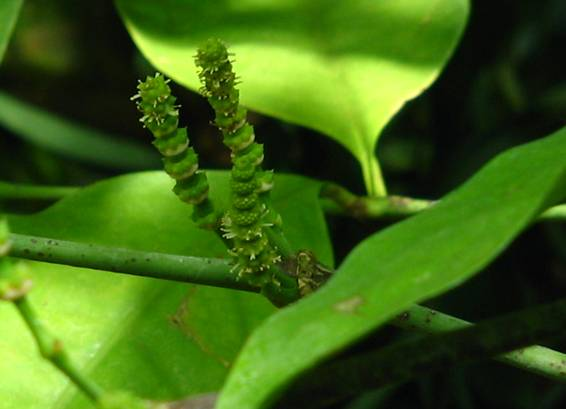
Gnetum gnemon male strobili

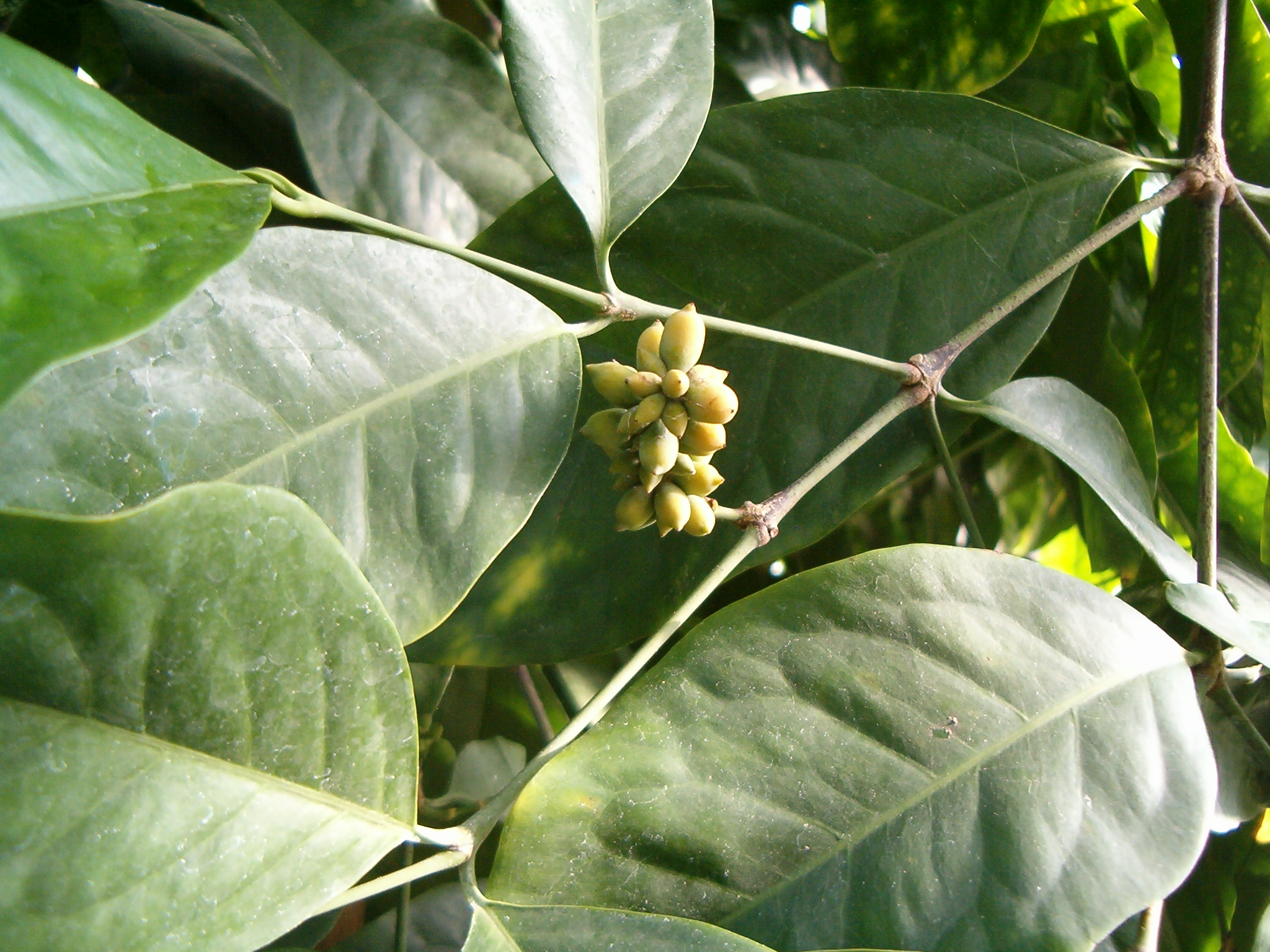
Gnetum gnemon female strobilus

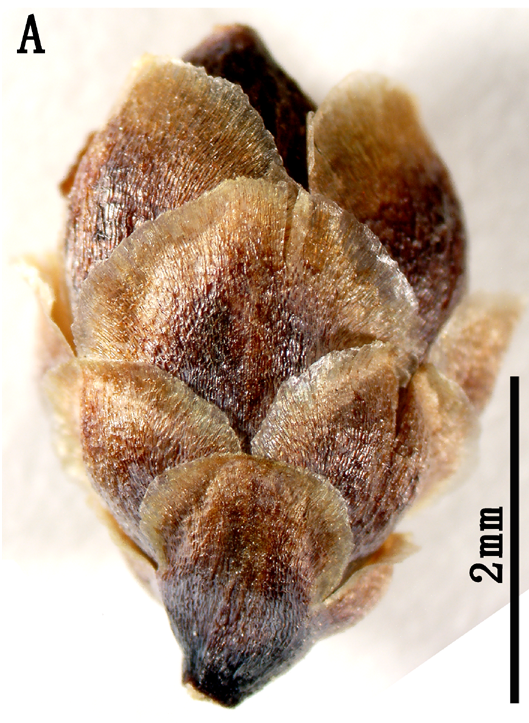
Female Ephedra californica cone

== Ecology and morphology ==
Unlike most biological groupings, it is difficult to find many common characteristics among all of the members of the gnetophytes. The two common characteristics most commonly used are the presence of enveloping bracts around both the ovules and microsporangia as well as a micropylar projection of the outer membrane of the ovule that produces a pollination droplet, though these are highly specific compared to the similarities between most other plant divisions. L. M. Bowe refers to the gnetophyte genera as a "bizarre and enigmatic" trio because the gnetophytes' specialization to their respective environments is so complete that they hardly resemble each other at all. Gnetum species are mostly woody vines in tropical forests, though the best-known member of this group, Gnetum gnemon, is a tree native to western Malesia. The one remaining species of Welwitschia, Welwitschia mirabilis, native only to the dry deserts of Namibia and Angola, is a ground-hugging species with only two large strap-like leaves that grow continuously from the base throughout the plant's life. Ephedra species, with a wide distribution in dry climate zones, have long slender branches which bear tiny scale-like leaves at their nodes.

== Classification ==
With just three well-defined genera within an entire division, there has been difficulty in establishing an unambiguous interrelationship among them; in earlier times matters were even more difficult, with Pearson in the early 20th century discussing the class Gnetales, rather than the order. G. H. M. Lawrence referred to them as an order, but remarked that the three families were distinct enough to deserve recognition as separate orders. Foster & Gifford accepted this principle, and placed the three orders together in a common class for convenience, which they called Gnetopsida. In general the evolutionary relationships among the seed plants still are unresolved, and the Gnetophyta have played an important role in the formation of phylogenetic hypotheses. Molecular phylogenies of extant gymnosperms have conflicted with morphological characters with regard to whether the gymnosperms as a whole (including gnetophytes) comprise a monophyletic group or a paraphyletic one that gave rise to angiosperms. At issue is whether the Gnetophyta are the sister group of angiosperms, or whether they are sister to, or nested within, other extant gymnosperms. Numerous fossil gymnosperm clades once existed that are morphologically at least as distinctive as the four living gymnosperm groups, such as Bennettitales, Caytonia and the glossopterids. When these gymnosperm fossils are considered, the question of gnetophyte relationships to other seed plants becomes even more complicated. Several hypotheses, illustrated below, have been presented to explain seed plant evolution. Some morphological studies have supported a close relationship between Gnetophyta, Bennettitales and the Erdtmanithecales.

Other authors have suggested that the Gnetophyta are a sister group to the rest of the gymnosperms, contradicting the anthophyte hypothesis, which held that gnetophytes were sister to the flowering plants.

=== Gnetifer hypothesis ===
In the gnetifer hypothesis, the gnetophytes are sister to the conifers, and the gymnosperms are a monophyletic group, sister to the angiosperms. The gnetifer hypothesis first emerged formally in the mid-twentieth century, when vessel elements in the gnetophytes were interpreted as being derived from tracheids with circular bordered pits, as in conifers. It however only gained strong support with the emergence of molecular data in the late 1990s. Although the most salient morphological evidence still largely supports the anthophyte hypothesis, some more obscure morphological commonalities between the gnetophytes and conifers lend support to the gnetifer hypothesis. These shared traits include tracheids with scalariform pits with tori interspersed with annular thickenings, absence of scalariform pitting in primary xylem, scale-like and strap-shaped leaves of Ephedra and Welwitschia; and reduced sporophylls.

- angiosperms (flowering plants)
- gymnosperms
  - cycads
  - Ginkgo
  - "Gnetifers"
    - conifers
    - gnetophytes

=== Anthophyte hypothesis ===
From the early twentieth century, the anthophyte hypothesis was the prevailing explanation for seed plant evolution, based on shared morphological characters between the gnetophytes and angiosperms. In this hypothesis, the gnetophytes, along with the extinct order Bennettitales, are sister to the angiosperms, forming the "anthophytes". Some morphological characters that were suggested to unite the anthophytes include vessels in wood, net-veined leaves (in Gnetum only), lignin chemistry, the layering of cells in the apical meristem, pollen and megaspore features (including thin megaspore wall), short cambial initials, and lignin syringal groups. However, most genetic studies, as well as more recent morphological analyses, have rejected the anthophyte hypothesis. It has been suggested that the gnetophytes and angiosperms have independently derived characters, including flower-like reproductive structures and tracheid vessel elements, that appear shared but are actually the result of parallel evolution.

- Ginkgo
- cycads
- conifers
- anthophytes
  - angiosperms (flowering plants)
  - gnetophytes

=== Gnepine hypothesis ===
The gnepine hypothesis is a modification of the gnetifer hypothesis, and suggests that the gnetophytes belong within the conifers as a sister group to the Pinaceae. According to this hypothesis, the conifers as currently defined are not a monophyletic group, in contrast with molecular findings that support its monophyly. One of the traits shared by both groups, is the absence of biflavonoids. A 2018 phylogenomic study estimated the divergence between Gnetales and Pinaceae at around 241 millions of years ago, in the early Triassic while a 2021 study placed it earlier, in the Carboniferous.

However, the morphological evidence remains difficult to reconcile with the gnepine hypothesis. If the gnetophytes are nested within conifers, they must have lost several shared derived characters of the conifers (or these characters must have evolved in parallel in the other two conifer lineages); narrowly triangular leaves (gnetophytes have diverse leaf shapes), resin canals, a tiered proembryo, and flat woody ovuliferous cone scales. These kinds of major morphological changes are not without precedent in the Pinidae, however. The Taxaceae, for example, have lost the classical cone of the conifers, instead producing a single-terminal ovule, surrounded by a fleshy aril, and most species in Podocarpaceae show similar adaptations; in both, related to seed dispersal by birds rather than wind.

- angiosperms (flowering plants)
- gymnosperms
  - cycads
  - Ginkgo
  - conifers
    - "Gnepines"
      - Pinaceae (the pine family)
      - gnetophytes
    - (other conifers)

=== Gnetophyte-sister hypothesis ===
Some partitions of the genetic data suggest that the gnetophytes are sister to all other extant seed plant groups. However, there is no morphological evidence nor examples from the fossil record to support the gnetophyte-sister hypotheses.

- gnetophytes
- - angiosperms (flowering plants)
  - - cycads
    - Ginkgo
    - conifers

== Fossil history ==
Knowledge of gnetophyte history through fossil discovery has increased greatly since the 1980s. Although some fossils that have been proposed to be gnetophytes have been found as far back as the Permian, their affinities to the group are equivocal. The oldest fossils that are definitely assignable to the group date to the Late Jurassic. Overall, the fossil record of the group is richest during the Early Cretaceous, exhibiting a substantial decline during the Late Cretaceous.

Ephedraceae

- Leongathia V.A. Krassilov, D.L. Dilcher & J.G. Douglas, 1998 Koonwarra Fossil Bed, Australia, Early Cretaceous (Aptian)
- Jianchangia Yang, Wang and Ferguson, 2020 Jiufotang Formation, China, Early Cretaceous (Aptian)
- Eamesia Yang, Lin and Ferguson, 2018 Yixian Formation, China, Early Cretaceous (Aptian)
- Prognetella Krassilov et Bugdaeva, 1999 Yixian Formation, China, Early Cretaceous (Aptian) (initially interpreted as an angiosperm)
- Chengia Yang, Lin & Wang, 2013, Yixian Formation, China, Early Cretaceous (Aptian)
- Chaoyangia Duan, 1998 Yixian Formation, China, Early Cretaceous (Aptian)
- Eragrosites Yixian Formation, China, Early Cretaceous (Aptian)
- Gurvanella China, Mongolia, Early Cretaceous
- Alloephedra China, Early Cretaceous
- Amphiephedra China, Early Cretaceous
- Beipiaoa China, Early Cretaceous
- Ephedrispermum Portugal, Early Cretaceous (Aptian-Albian)
- Ephedrites China, Early Cretaceous
- Erenia China, Mongolia, Early Cretaceous
- Liaoxia China, Early Cretaceous
- Dichoephedra China, Early Cretaceous
- Laiyangia P.H. Jin, 2024 China, Early Cretaceous

Gnetaceae

- Khitania Guo et al. 2009 Yixian Formation, China, Early Cretaceous (Aptian)
- Gnetaceaepollenites (Wodehouse) R. Potonié, 1958 Green River Formation, USA, Early Eocene

Welwitschiaceae

- Priscowelwitschia Dilcher et al., 2005 Crato Formation, Brazil, Early Cretaceous (Aptian)
- Cratonia Rydin et al., 2003 Crato Formation, Brazil, Early Cretaceous (Aptian)
- Welwitschiostrobus Dilcher et al., 2005 Crato Formation, Brazil, Early Cretaceous (Aptian)

Incertae sedis:

- Archangelskyoxylon Brea, Gnaedinger & Martínez, 2023 Roca Blanca Formation, Argentina, Sinemurian–Toarcian (closely related to Weltwitschia and Gnetum).
- Drewria Crane & Upchurch, 1987 Potomac Group, USA, Albian (possible affinities to Welwitschiaceae)
- Bicatia Friis, Pedersen and Crane, 2014 Figueira da Foz Formation, Portugal, Early Cretaceous (late Aptian early Albian), Potomac Group, USA, Albian (possible affinities to Welwitschiaceae)
- Liaoningia Yang et al., 2017 Yixian Formation, China, Early Cretaceous (Aptian)
- Protognetum Y. Yang, L. Xie et D.K. Ferguson, 2017 Daohugou Bed, China, Middle Jurassic (Callovian)
- Itajuba Ricardi-Branco et al., 2013, Crato Formation, Brazil, Early Cretaceous (Aptian)
- Protoephedrites Rothwell et Stockey, 2013 Canada, Valanginian (possible ephedroid affinities)
- Siphonospermum Rydin et Friis, 2010 Yixian Formation, China, Early Cretaceous (Aptian)
- Welwitschiophyllum Dilcher et al., 2005 Crato Formation, Brazil, Early Cretaceous (Aptian), Akrabou Formation, Morocco, Late Cretaceous (Cenomanian-Turonian) (Initially interpreted as a member of Welwitschiaceae, later considered uncertain).
- Dayvaultia Manchester et al. 2021 Morrison Formation, USA, Late Jurassic (Tithonian)
- Daohugoucladus Yang et al. 2023 Daohugou Bed, China, Middle Jurassic (Callovian)

Possible gnetophytes (not confirmed as members of the group)

- Archaestrobilus Trujillo Formation, Texas, United States, Upper Triassic
- Dechellyia-Masculostrobus Mongolia, Early Cretaceous (Aptian-Albian)
- Dinophyton Chinle Formation, United States, Upper Triassic
- Nataligma Molteno Formation, South Africa, Upper Triassic (Carnian)
- Palaeognetaleana Wang et al, 2004, China, Upper Permian
- Sanmiguelia United States, Late Triassic-Early Jurassic
- Eoantha Russia, Early Cretaceous
- Bassitheca Morrison Formation, USA, Late Jurassic (Tithonian)
