= Isorhapontin =

- Chemical structure of isorhapontin

Names
- IUPAC name 3-Hydroxy-5-[(1E)-2-(4-hydroxy-3-methoxyphenyl)ethen-1-yl]phenoxy β-D-glucopyranoside
- Systematic IUPAC name (2S,3R,4S,5S,6R)-2-{3-Hydroxy-5-[(1E)-2-(4-hydroxy-3-methoxyphenyl)ethen-1-yl]phenoxy}-6-(hydroxymethyl)oxane-3,4,5-triol
- Other names Isorhapontigenin glucoside

Identifiers
CAS Number	32727-29-0
3D model (JSmol)	Interactive image
ChemSpider	4445032
ECHA InfoCard	100.230.305
KEGG	C10266
PubChem CID	5281716
UNII	BNH6WEN5L8
CompTox Dashboard (EPA)	DTXSID701031823
- InChI: InChI=1S/C21H24O9/c1-28-16-8-11(4-5-15(16)24)2-3-12-6-13(23)9-14(7-12)29-21-20(27)19(26)18(25)17(10-22)30-21/h2-9,17-27H,10H2,1H3/b3-2+/t17-,18-,19+,20-,21-/m1/s1 Key: KLPUXMNQDCUPNO-DXKBKAGUSA-N
- SMILES: COC1=C(C=CC(=C1)/C=C/C2=CC(=CC(=C2)O[C@H]3[C@@H]([C@H]([C@@H]([C@H](O3)CO)O)O)O)O)O

Properties
Chemical formula	C_{21}H_{24}O_{9}
Molar mass	420.41 g/mol
- Except where otherwise noted, data are given for materials in their standard state (at 25 °C [77 °F], 100 kPa). Infobox references

Isorhapontin is a stilbenoid. It is the glucoside of isorhapontigenin. It can be found in mycorrhizal and non-mycorrhizal roots of Norway spruces (Picea abies), in the bark of Picea sitchensis or in white spruce (Picea glauca).
