= Rhaponticin =

- Chemical structure of rhaponticin

Names
- IUPAC name 3-Hydroxy-5-[(E)-2-(3-hydroxy-4-methoxyphenyl)ethen-1-yl]phenyl β-D-glucopyranoside
- Systematic IUPAC name (2S,3R,4S,5S,6R)-2-{3-Hydroxy-5-[(E)-2-(3-hydroxy-4-methoxyphenyl)ethen-1-yl]phenoxy}-6-(hydroxymethyl)oxane-3,4,5-triol
- Other names 3',5-Dihydroxy-4'-methoxystilbene 3-O-beta-D-glucopyranoside; Ponticin; Rhapontin; Rhapontigenin glucoside

Identifiers
CAS Number	155-58-8
3D model (JSmol)	Interactive image
ChEBI	CHEBI:8824
ChEMBL	ChEMBL109266
ChemSpider	552853
ECHA InfoCard	100.005.315
EC Number	205-845-0
KEGG	C10288
PubChem CID	637213
UNII	K691M2Z08V
CompTox Dashboard (EPA)	DTXSID201018153
- InChI: InChI=1S/C21H24O9/c1-28-16-5-4-11(8-15(16)24)2-3-12-6-13(23)9-14(7-12)29-21-20(27)19(26)18(25)17(10-22)30-21/h2-9,17-27H,10H2,1H3/b3-2+/t17-,18-,19+,20-,21-/m1/s1 Key: GKAJCVFOJGXVIA-DXKBKAGUSA-N; InChI=1/C21H24O9/c1-28-16-5-4-11(8-15(16)24)2-3-12-6-13(23)9-14(7-12)29-21-20(27)19(26)18(25)17(10-22)30-21/h2-9,17-27H,10H2,1H3/b3-2+/t17-,18-,19+,20-,21-/m1/s1 Key: GKAJCVFOJGXVIA-DXKBKAGUBB
- SMILES: COc1ccc(cc1O)/C=C/c2cc(cc(c2)O[C@H]3[C@@H]([C@H]([C@@H]([C@H](O3)CO)O)O)O)O

Properties
Chemical formula	C_{21}H_{24}O_{9}
Molar mass	420,39 g/mol
- Except where otherwise noted, data are given for materials in their standard state (at 25 °C [77 °F], 100 kPa). verify (what is ?) Infobox references

Rhaponticin is a stilbenoid glucoside compound. Its aglycone is called rhapontigenin. It can be found in rhubarb rhizomes.

It has beneficial effects on diabetic mice, and in vitro results suggest it may be relevant to Alzheimer's disease with an action on beta amyloid. It is a phytoestrogen and has estrogenic activity.
