= Gnetucleistol =

Group of chemical compounds

Gnetucleistols are a group of chemical compounds of the stilbenoid class isolated from plants in the genus Gnetum. They are desigated gnetucleistol A through F. All the gnetucleistols have been isolated from Gnetum cleistostachyum, a plant used in traditional Chinese medicine. Gnetucleistol C has also been found in Gnetum microcarpum and Gnetum cuspidatum.

== Chemical structures ==
Gnetucleistol A

Gnetucleistol B

Gnetucleistol C

Gnetucleistol D

Gnetucleistol E

Gnetucleistol F
