= Rhapontigenin =

- Chemical structure of rhapontigenin

Names
- Preferred IUPAC name 5-[(E)-2-(3-Hydroxy-4-methoxyphenyl)ethen-1-yl]benzene-1,3-diol
- Other names Protigenin; 3,3',5-trihydroxy-4'-methoxystilbene piceatannol 4'-methyl ether

Identifiers
CAS Number	500-65-2
3D model (JSmol)	Interactive image
ChEBI	CHEBI:174376
ChEMBL	ChEMBL113029
ChemSpider	4478875
PubChem CID	5320954
UNII	22BG4NNH6W
CompTox Dashboard (EPA)	DTXSID501023634
- InChI: InChI=1S/C15H14O4/c1-19-15-5-4-10(8-14(15)18)2-3-11-6-12(16)9-13(17)7-11/h2-9,16-18H,1H3/b3-2+ Key: PHMHDRYYFAYWEG-NSCUHMNNSA-N
- SMILES: COc1ccc(cc1O)\C=C\c(cc2O)cc(O)c2

Properties
Chemical formula	C_{15}H_{14}O_{4}
Molar mass	258.27 g/mol
- Except where otherwise noted, data are given for materials in their standard state (at 25 °C [77 °F], 100 kPa). Infobox references

Rhapontigenin is a stilbenoid. It can be isolated from Vitis coignetiae or from Gnetum cleistostachyum.

It shows an action on prostate cancer cells. It has been shown to inhibit the human cytochrome P450 1A1, an enzyme implicated in the biotransformation of a number of carcinogenic and immunotoxic compounds.

Injected in rats, rhapontigenin shows a rapid glucuronidation and a poor bioavailability.

== See also ==
- Rhaponticin, its glucoside, found in rhubarb.
- Isorhapontigenin, a structural isomer.
