= Gnetucleistol D =

- Chemical structure of gnetucleistol D

Names
- Preferred IUPAC name 5-[(E)-2-(4-Hydroxy-2-methoxyphenyl)ethen-1-yl]benzene-1,3-diol
- Other names 2-methoxyoxyresveratrol

Identifiers
CAS Number	629643-26-1
3D model (JSmol)	Interactive image
ChEMBL	ChEMBL219050
ChemSpider	23279071
PubChem CID	44419358
UNII	W4XBS7AED8
CompTox Dashboard (EPA)	DTXSID70804092
- InChI: InChI=1S/C15H14O4/c1-19-15-9-12(16)5-4-11(15)3-2-10-6-13(17)8-14(18)7-10/h2-9,16-18H,1H3/b3-2+ Key: CFQSTARVCGBYNJ-NSCUHMNNSA-N; InChI=1/C15H14O4/c1-19-15-9-12(16)5-4-11(15)3-2-10-6-13(17)8-14(18)7-10/h2-9,16-18H,1H3/b3-2+ Key: CFQSTARVCGBYNJ-NSCUHMNNBH
- SMILES: COc2cc(O)ccc2/C=C/c1cc(O)cc(O)c1

Properties
Chemical formula	C_{15}H_{14}O_{4}
Molar mass	258.273 g·mol^{−1}
- Except where otherwise noted, data are given for materials in their standard state (at 25 °C [77 °F], 100 kPa). Infobox references

Gnetucleistol D is a stilbenoid of the gnetucleistol group found in the Chinese herb Gnetum cleistostachyum.
