= O-Desmethylangolensin =

Names
- IUPAC name 1-(2,4-Dihydroxyphenyl)-2-(4-hydroxyphenyl)-1-propanone

Identifiers
CAS Number	21255-69-6
3D model (JSmol)	Interactive image
ChEBI	CHEBI:88902
ChemSpider	80750
ECHA InfoCard	100.230.083
KEGG	C22559
PubChem CID	89472
UNII	SCY1S10OK4
CompTox Dashboard (EPA)	DTXSID40873154
- InChI: InChI=1S/C15H14O4/c1-9(10-2-4-11(16)5-3-10)15(19)13-7-6-12(17)8-14(13)18/h2-9,16-18H,1H3 Key: JDJPNKPFDDUBFV-UHFFFAOYSA-N
- SMILES: CC(c1ccc(cc1)O)C(=O)c2ccc(cc2O)O

Properties
Chemical formula	C_{15}H_{14}O_{4}
Molar mass	258.273 g·mol^{−1}

Hazards
- GHS labelling
Pictograms	(GHS05: Corrosive) (GHS07: Exclamation mark) (GHS09: Environmental hazard)
Signal word	Danger
Hazard statements	H302, H318, H410
Precautionary statements	P264, P270, P273, P280, P301+P312, P305+P351+P338, P310, P330, P391, P501
- Except where otherwise noted, data are given for materials in their standard state (at 25 °C [77 °F], 100 kPa). Infobox references

O-Desmethylangolensin (O-DMA) is a phytoestrogen. It is an intestinal bacterial metabolite of the soy phytoestrogen daidzein. It produced in some people, deemed O-DMA producers, but not others. O-DMA producers were associated with 69% greater mammographic density and 6% bone density.

== See also ==
- Equol
