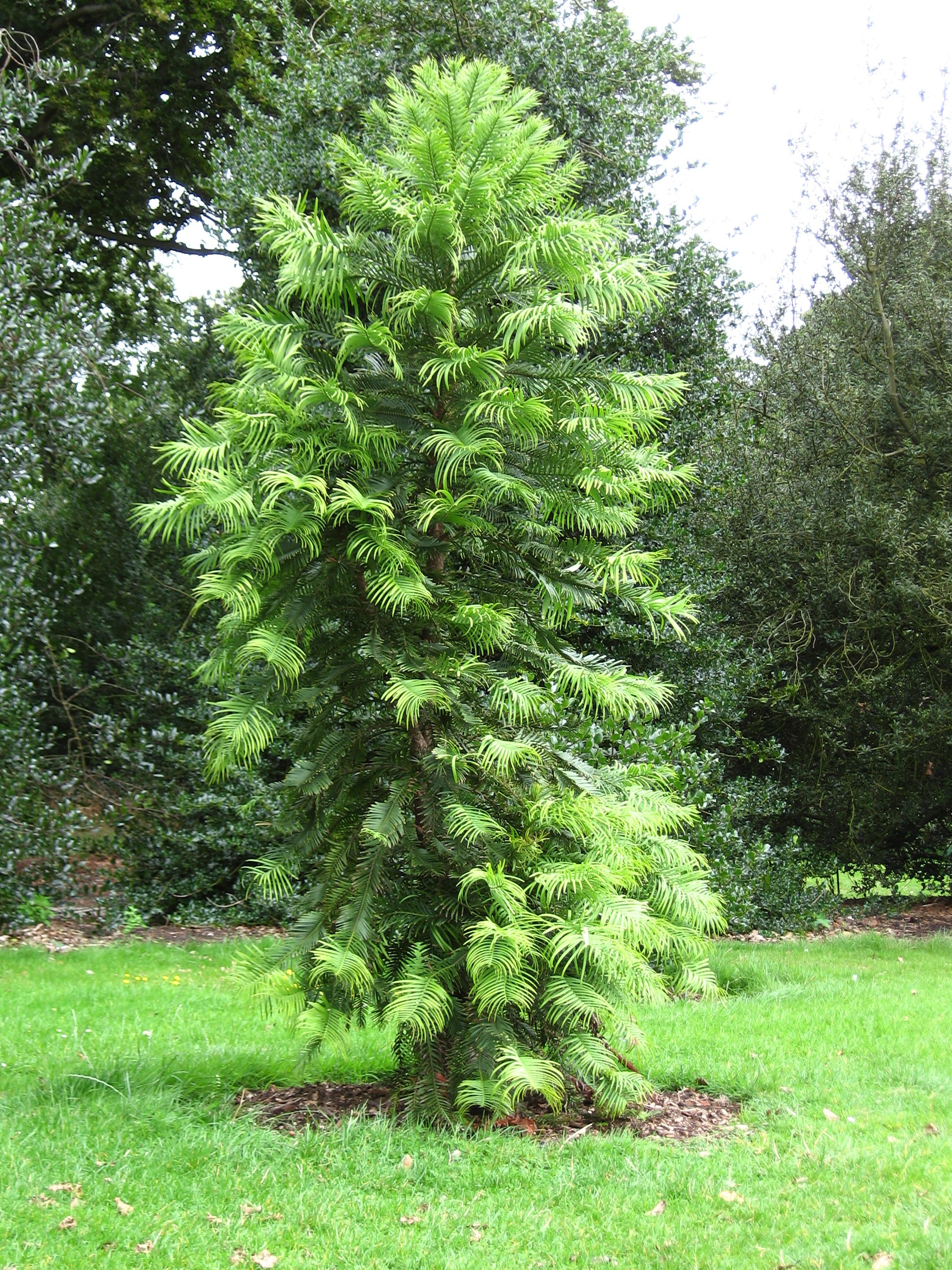
- Wollemia nobilis

Scientific classification
- Kingdom: Plantae
- Clade: Tracheophytes
- Clade: Gymnosperms
- Division: Pinophyta
- Class: Pinopsida
- Subclass: Cupressidae; Doweld

Orders and families
- Araucariales; Araucariaceae; Podocarpaceae; Cupressales; Sciadopityaceae; Cupressaceae; Cephalotaxaceae; Taxaceae

= Cupressidae =

Cupressidae Temporal range: 245.0–0 Ma

Subclass of plants

Cupressidae, also known as cupressophytes and conifers II (as opposed to conifers I) is a proposed subclass of conifers comprising the orders of Araucariales and Cupressales. It was originally erected by Alexander Doweld and contained just Cupressales. In 2022, a study expanded it to include Araucariales and Cupressales.
