= Isorhapontigenin =

Names
- Preferred IUPAC name 5-[(E)-2-(4-Hydroxy-3-methoxyphenyl)ethen-1-yl]benzene-1,3-diol
- Other names 3,4',5-trihydroxy-3'-methoxystilbene ISO

Identifiers
CAS Number	32507-66-7; 20767-15-1 (non-specific)
3D model (JSmol)	Interactive image
ChEBI	CHEBI:167830
ChemSpider	4477172
ECHA InfoCard	100.230.279
PubChem CID	5318650
UNII	CZ49V3K5HS
CompTox Dashboard (EPA)	DTXSID601045304
- InChI: InChI=1S/C15H14O4/c1-19-15-8-10(4-5-14(15)18)2-3-11-6-12(16)9-13(17)7-11/h2-9,16-18H,1H3/b3-2+ Key: ANNNBEZJTNCXHY-NSCUHMNNSA-N; InChI=1/C15H14O4/c1-19-15-8-10(4-5-14(15)18)2-3-11-6-12(16)9-13(17)7-11/h2-9,16-18H,1H3/b3-2+ Key: ANNNBEZJTNCXHY-NSCUHMNNBY
- SMILES: COC1=C(C=CC(=C1)C=CC2=CC(=CC(=C2)O)O)O

Properties
Chemical formula	C_{15}H_{14}O_{4}
Molar mass	258.27 g/mol
- Except where otherwise noted, data are given for materials in their standard state (at 25 °C [77 °F], 100 kPa). Infobox references

Isorhapontigenin is a tetrahydroxylated stilbenoid with a methoxy group. It is an isomer of rhapontigenin and an analog of resveratrol. It is found in the Chinese herb Gnetum cleistostachyum, in Gnetum parvifolium and in the seeds of the palm Aiphanes aculeata.

An isorhapontigenin tetramer, gnetuhainin R, can be isolated from the lianas of Gnetum hainanense.

Isorhapontin, the isorhapontigenin glucoside, can be found in spruce species such as the Norway spruce (Picea abies), the sitka spruce (Picea sitchensis) and the white spruce (Picea glauca).
