= 4-Methoxyresveratrol =

- Chemical structure of 4-methoxyresveratrol

Names
- Preferred IUPAC name 5-[(E)-2-(4-Methoxyphenyl)ethen-1-yl]benzene-1,3-diol
- Other names 4′-Methoxyresveratrol; Deoxyrhapontigenin; Desoxyrhapontigenin

Identifiers
CAS Number	33626-08-3; 65728-21-4 (non-specific)
3D model (JSmol)	Interactive image
ChEBI	CHEBI:108593
ChemSpider	4863932
PubChem CID	5040205
UNII	RU7RRY3RUW
CompTox Dashboard (EPA)	DTXSID101031720
- InChI: InChI=1S/C15H14O3/c1-18-15-6-4-11(5-7-15)2-3-12-8-13(16)10-14(17)9-12/h2-10,16-17H,1H3 Key: IHVRWFJGOIWMGC-UHFFFAOYSA-N
- SMILES: COC1=CC=C(C=C1)/C=C/C2=CC(=CC(=C2)O)O

Properties
Chemical formula	C_{15}H_{14}O_{3}
Molar mass	242.27 g/mol
- Except where otherwise noted, data are given for materials in their standard state (at 25 °C [77 °F], 100 kPa). Infobox references

4-Methoxyresveratrol is a stilbenoid found in the Chinese herb Gnetum cleistostachyum.
