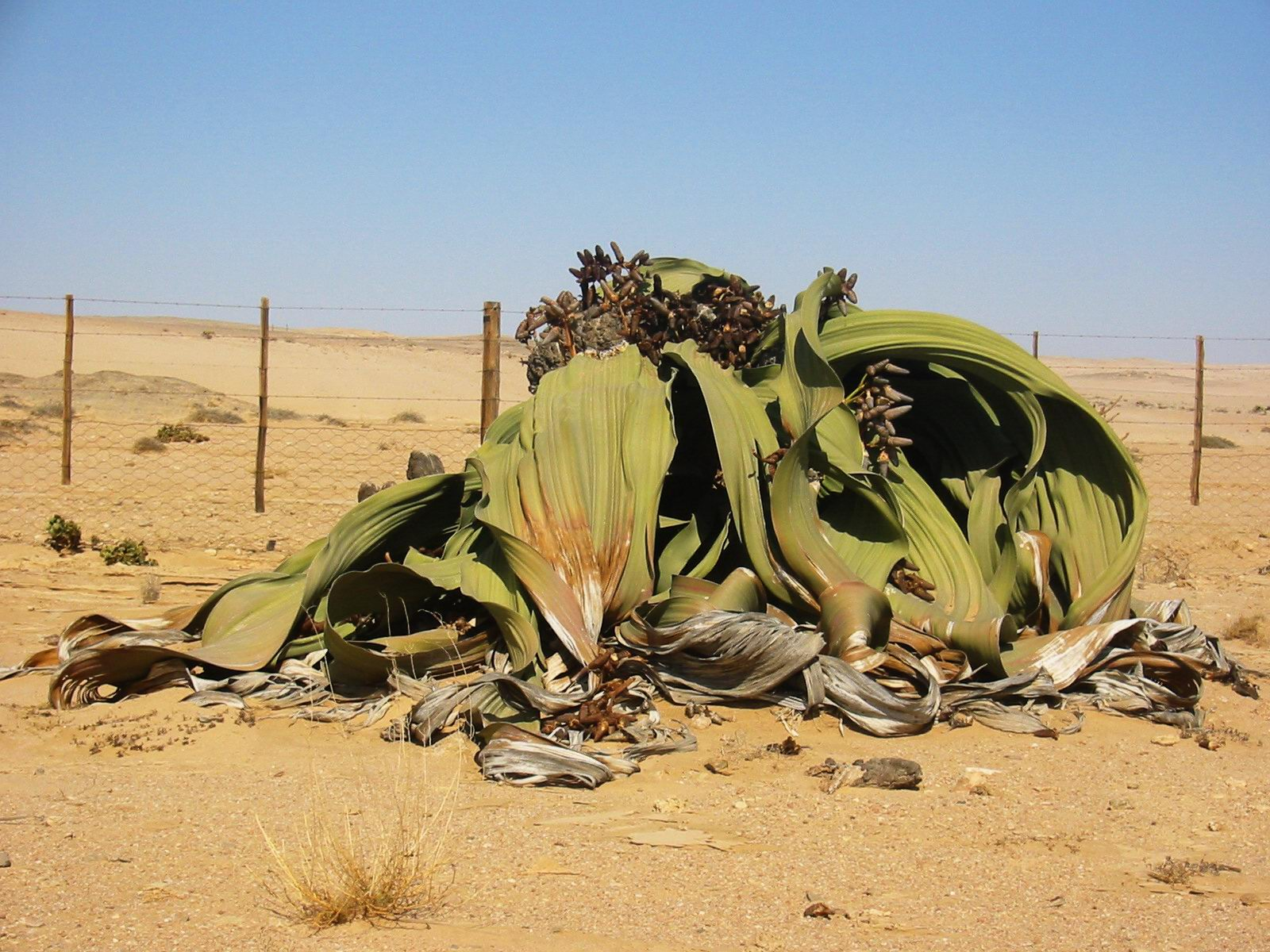

Scientific classification
- Kingdom: Plantae
- Clade: Tracheophytes
- Clade: Gymnosperms
- Division: Pinophyta
- Class: Pinopsida
- Subclass: Gnetidae
- Order: Welwitschiales
- Family: Welwitschiaceae
- Genus: Welwitschia; Hook.f.
- Species: W. mirabilis

Binomial name
- Welwitschia mirabilis Hook.f.
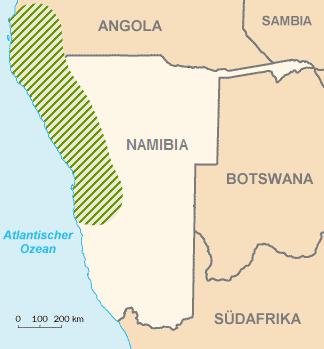
- Range of Welwitschia (diagonal hatching)

Synonyms
- 4 Synonyms: Tumboa bainesii Hook.f. (1861); Welwitschia bainesii (Hook.f.) Carrière (1867); W. mirabilis subsp. namibiana Leuenb. (2001); W. namibiana (Leuenb.) Christenh. & Byng (2018)

= Welwitschia =

Monotypic genus of plants

Welwitschia is a monotypic genus of gnetophytes containing only the species Welwitschia mirabilis. It is named after the Austrian botanist Friedrich Welwitsch, who documented the plant in the 1850s. In common use, it is sometimes referred to as the tree tumbo or onyanga. It is native to Angola and Namibia, where it grows in the extreme conditions of the Namib desert, tolerating high heat and low precipitation. Welwitschia is the only living genus of the family Welwitschiaceae and order Welwitschiales, and is one of three extant genera of gnetophytes, alongside Gnetum and Ephedra.

Welwitschia is well known for its unique morphology. The plant has only two leaves that grow out of a large woody stem, known as a crown, and continue to grow throughout the plant's life. Welwitschia is one of the longest-living plants on Earth, with some individuals being thousands of years old. Because of the long lifespan the leaves can become quite large, often reaching several meters in length.

As a gymnosperm, Welwitschia uses cones to reproduce. Both male and female plants produce nectar from their cones that attract insects that then carry the pollen to other plants. The species is not currently in any significant danger of extinction, in part because its long lifespan insulates it from temporary reproductive struggles. Despite this, Welwitschia is susceptible to future overgrazing and disease, because it grows in only one environment.

== Taxonomy ==
Welwitschia is named after Austrian botanist and doctor Friedrich Welwitsch, who documented the plant in Angola in 1859. Welwitsch was fascinated by the plant, writing, "I could do nothing but kneel down [...] and gaze at it, half in fear lest a touch should prove it a figment of the imagination." Joseph Dalton Hooker of the Linnean Society of London formally described the species using Welwitsch's description and collected material along with material from artist Thomas Baines, who had independently recorded the plant in Namibia. Welwitsch proposed calling the genus Tumboa after the local name, N'tumbo. Hooker asked Welwitsch for permission to name the genus Welwitschia instead. Welwitsch concurred and supplied some well-preserved material that Hooker was able to study.

The name Welwitschia was previously used in 1837 by Ludwig Reichenbach for a genus in the Polemoniaceae family that is considered to be a synonym of Eriastrum. For Hooker's name for this genus to become the accepted name required the name to be conserved under the International Code of Nomenclature for algae, fungi, and plants. The conservation of the name was approved on 18 May at the 1910 International Botanical Congress in Brussels.

The taxonomy of Welwitschia subsequently changed intermittently with the development of new classification systems. Its current taxonomic status is essentially the same as Hooker's placement. Most botanists have treated Welwitschia as a distinct monotypic genus in a monotypic family or even order. Most recent systems place Welwitschia mirabilis in the family Welwitschiaceae, which also includes several extinct species. The plant is commonly known simply as welwitschia in English, but the name tree tumbo is also used. It is called kharos or khurub in Nama, tweeblaarkanniedood ("two leaves; can't die") in Afrikaans, nyanka in Damara, and onyanga in Herero.

== Description ==
After germination, the seedling produces two cotyledons that grow to 25–35 mm (0.98–1.38 in) in length. They start off pink, but turn green shortly after germination. Subsequently, two permanent leaves emerge from the crown (large, woody stem) and are produced opposite (at right angles to) the cotyledons. The permanent leaves grow rapidly and last for the plant's entire life. They are long and ribbon-shaped, with their veins running down their length parallel to each other. Shortly after the appearance of the permanent leaves, the apical meristem dies and meristematic activity is transferred to the periphery of the crown. The two (rarely three) leaves grow continuously from the crown across its entire circumference, reaching lengths up to 4 m (13 ft). The crown is disc-shaped and widens with age, reaching up to a meter in diameter. The largest specimens may be no more than 1.5 m (4.9 ft) tall above ground, but the circumference of the leaves in contact with the sand may exceed 8 m (26 ft). The largest known individual is 2.77 metres (9.1 ft) in diameter and 8.7 m (29 ft) in circumference.

As the plant ages, the leaves often split into ribbons and become frayed from years of weathering. The age of individual plants is difficult to assess, with radiocarbon dating being the most common method in determining plant age. The plant is exceptionally long-lived, with many being hundreds of years old, and the oldest being perhaps as much as 2,000 years old.

Welwitschia is dioecious, with separate male and female plants. Both sexes produce cones that grow out of the crown of the plant, which often number in the hundreds. Cones can range from green to salmon and various shades of brown in color. The cones produce nectar that attracts various insects, most commonly flies, that then carry the oval-shaped pollen on them. The Welwitschia bug, Probergrothius angolensis, is commonly observed on the plant, but probably does not have a role in pollination; it is not particularly attracted to the nectar and is usually found on the leaves of the plant. Infrequently, wasps and bees also play a role as pollinators of Welwitschia.

Because Welwitschia produces only a single pair of leaves, the plant was thought by some to be neotenic, consisting essentially of a "giant seedling". However, research showed that its anatomy is not consistent with that of a "giant seedling". Instead, the plant is more accurately thought to achieve its unusual morphology as a result of having "lost its head" (apical meristem) at an early stage.

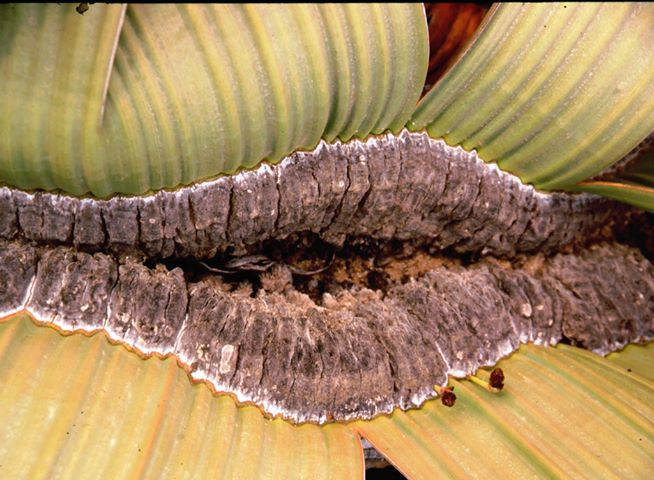
Crown

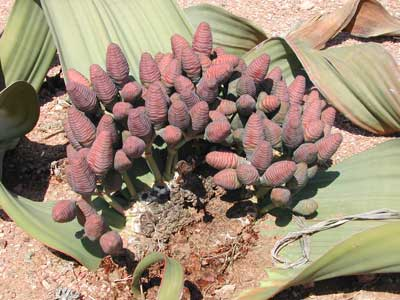
Female cones

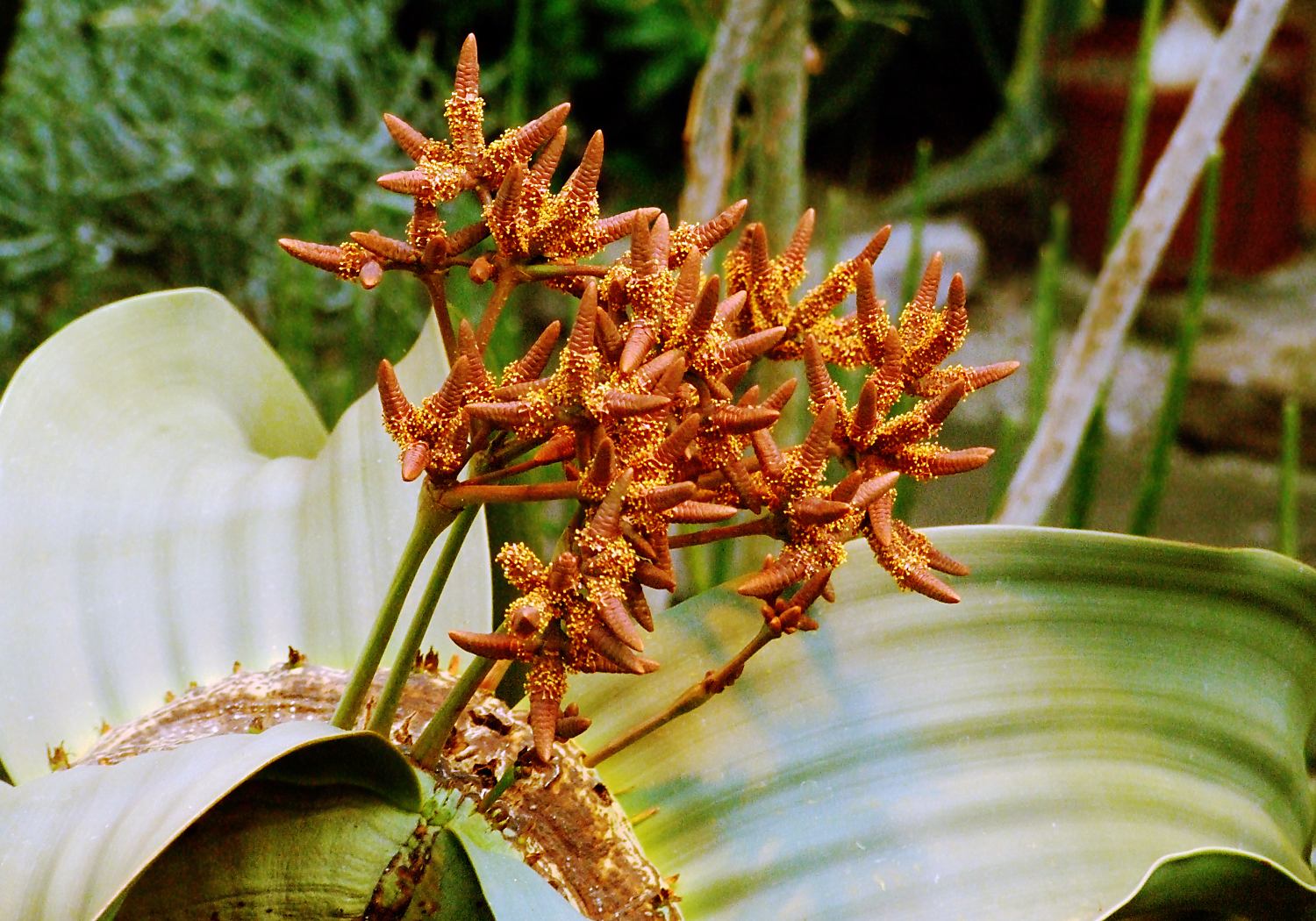
Male cones

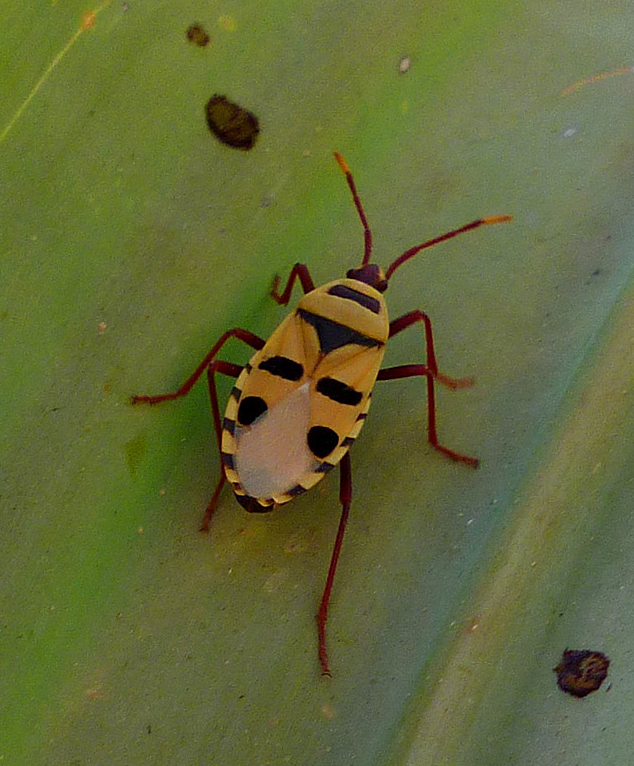
The Welwitschia bug, Probergrothius angolensis

== Genetics ==
In July 2021, the genome of Welwitschia mirabilis was reported to be 98% sequenced, comprising 6.8 Gb distributed across 21 chromosomes. The species underwent a whole-genome duplication approximately 86 million years ago. More recently, within the last 1–2 million years, episodes of increased retrotransposon activity occurred, likely triggered by environmental stress during a period of heightened aridity and prolonged drought. These events contributed to extensive genomic reshuffling and resulted in a genome containing a large proportion of repetitive, self-replicating DNA sequences. The expansion of these elements was subsequently counteracted by DNA methylation–mediated silencing, reducing the metabolic cost of maintaining such a large genome. Over time, significant deamination further reduced the GC-content to approximately 29.07%, one of the lowest values recorded among seed plants.

== Distribution and habitat ==
Welwitschia is endemic to the Namib desert. Its range stretches over 1,000 km (620 mi) along the Angolan and Namibian coast, being found between 14th and 24th southern parallels. The area is arid; the coast is recorded as having almost zero rainfall, while less than 100 mm (3.9 in) of rain falls annually below the escarpment in the wet season from February to April. Populations tend to occur in ephemeral water sources, indicating a dependence on groundwater in addition to precipitation from fog.

== Cultivation ==
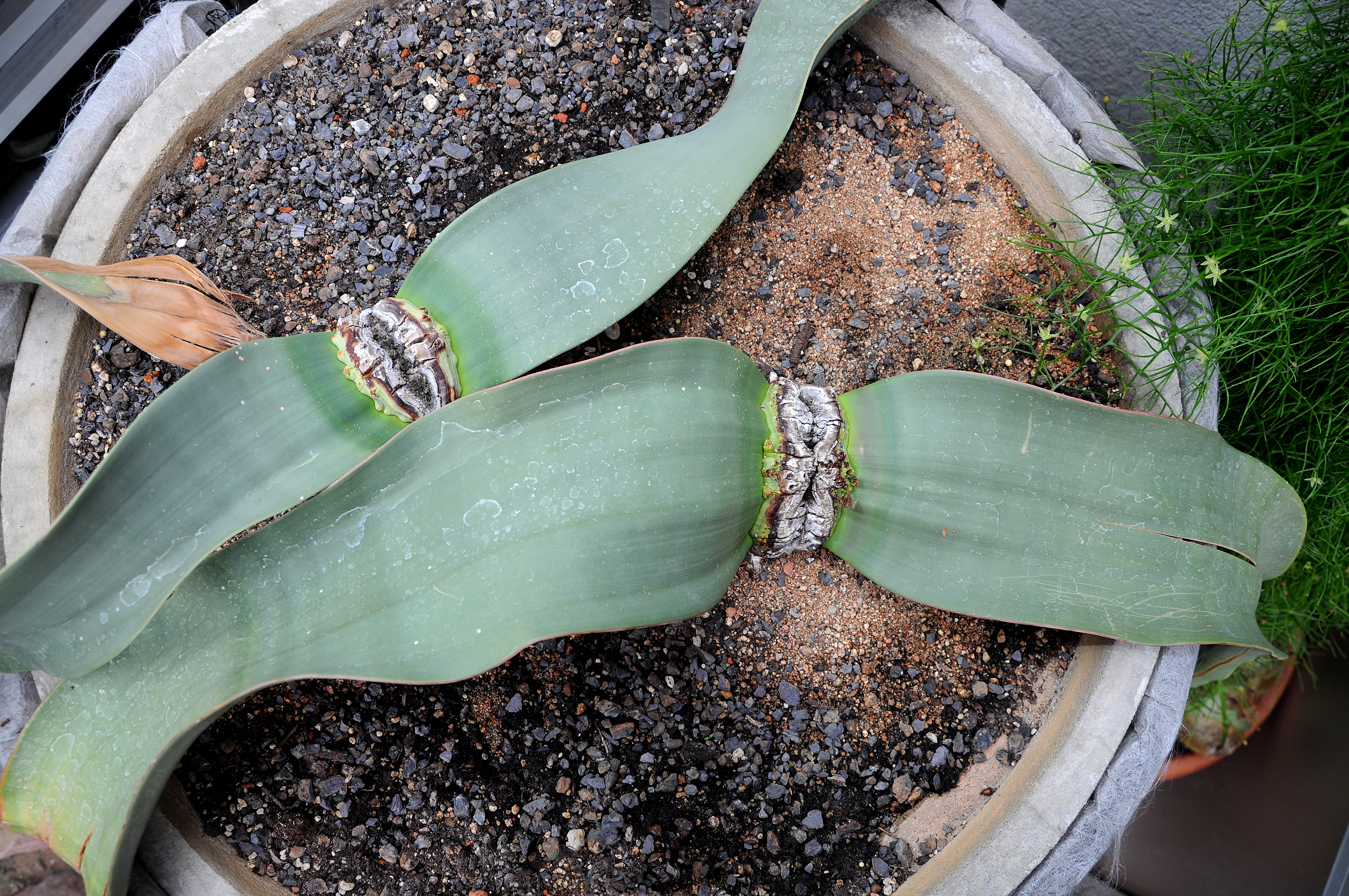
Two undamaged plants in cultivation; the two leaves are clearly distinct.

The coat of arms of Namibia. Welwitschia is seen growing at the bottom of the image.

Welwitschia grows from a seed, which can be bought from specialty seed dealers. The seeds have been shown to display orthodox seed behavior, meaning they can be stored for long periods of time at extreme humidity and temperature. Welwitschia seeds are able to survive temperatures as high as 80 °C (176 °F) and as low as −20 °C (−4 °F) without major side effects.

Seeds collected from the wild often are heavily contaminated with spores of the fungus Aspergillus niger, which causes them to rot shortly after they germinate. The fungus infects the growing cones of Welwitschia early in their development with a sharp increase in infection occurring when the pollination drop (a sugary substance produced by the ovule) appears. Because of this, seeds in the wild may be rendered nonviable before they develop fully. The fungicide tebuconazole may be useful in controlling limited A. niger seed infection.

Indigenous people occasionally consume the cone of the plant by eating it raw or baking it in hot ashes. The Herero name of the plant, onyanga, translates to "onion of the desert". Welwitschia is also featured on the coat of arms of Namibia growing from a sand dune.

== Conservation ==
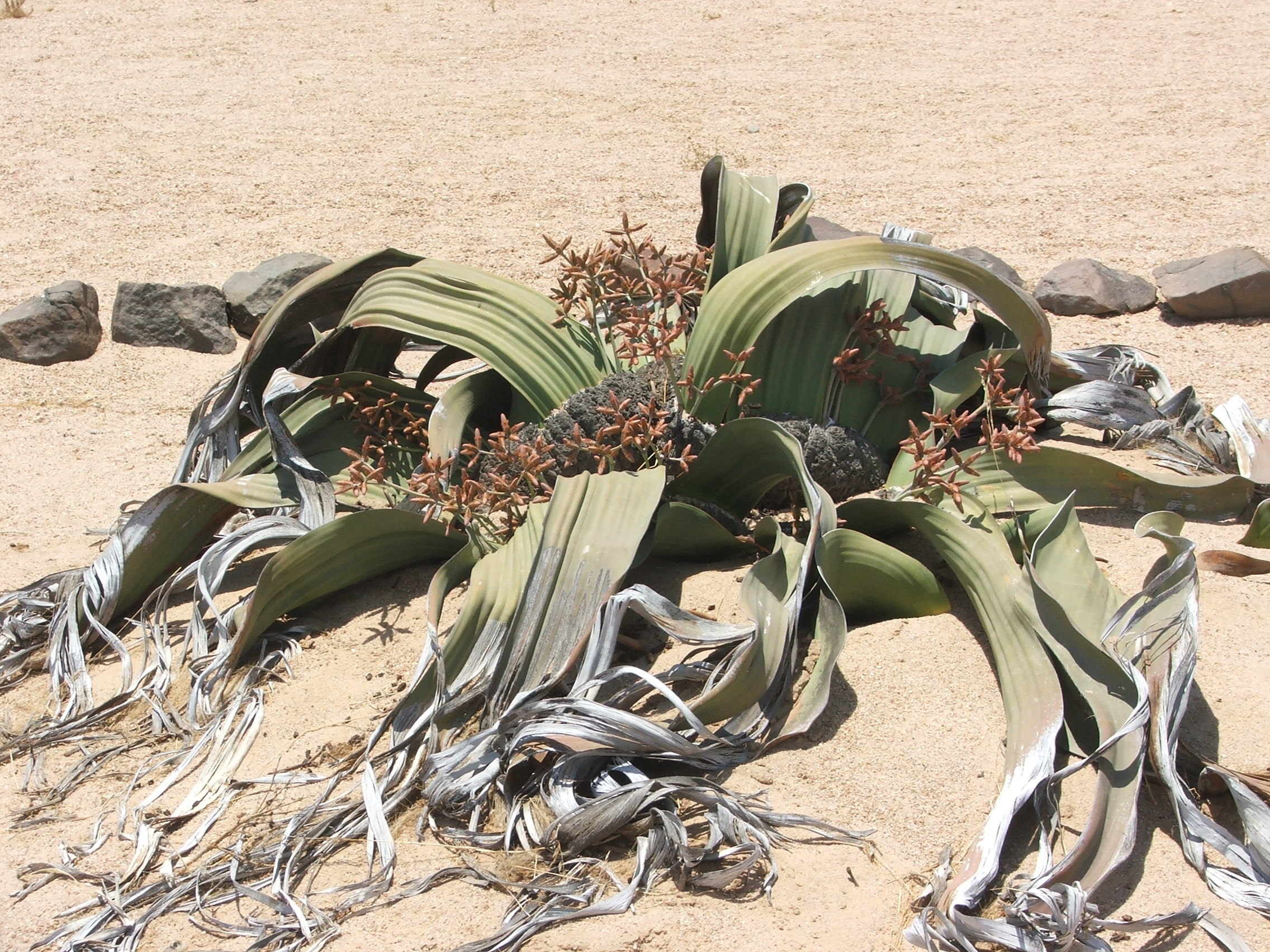
Wild plant with significant leaf damage

The wild population of Welwitschia is reasonably stable. The international trade in the plant is controlled under the Convention on International Trade in Endangered Species of Wild Fauna and Flora (CITES). Plants in Angola are generally better protected than those in Namibia because the relatively high concentration of land mines from the Angolan Civil War that remain in the former region.

Although Welwitschia is not immediately threatened, with abundant populations distributed over a large area, its status is far from secure; its recruitment and growth rates are low and its range, though wide, covers only a single compact, ecologically limited and vulnerable area. The remarkable longevity of Welwitschia favors its survival of temporary periods adverse to reproduction, but it offers no protection against direct threats, such as overgrazing and disease. Fungal infection of female cones severely reduces seed viability, reducing already inherently low recruitment. Other threats include injury from off-road vehicles, collection of wild plants and overgrazing by zebras, rhinos, and domestic animals.

== See also ==
- List of Southern African indigenous trees and woody lianes
