= 1,6-Bis(2,3-epoxypropoxy)naphthalene =

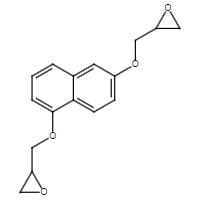

Names
- Preferred IUPAC name 2,2′-[Naphthalene-1,6-diylbis(oxymethylene)]bis(oxirane)

Identifiers
CAS Number	27610-48-6
3D model (JSmol)	Interactive image
ChemSpider	4167820
EC Number	429-960-2
PubChem CID	4987597
CompTox Dashboard (EPA)	DTXSID80884906
- InChI: InChI=1S/C16H16O4/c1-2-11-6-12(17-7-13-8-18-13)4-5-15(11)16(3-1)20-10-14-9-19-14/h1-6,13-14H,7-10H2 Key: MEVBAGCIOOTPLF-UHFFFAOYSA-N
- SMILES: C1C(O1)COC2=CC3=C(C=C2)C(=CC=C3)OCC4CO4

Properties
Chemical formula	C_{16}H_{16}O_{4}
Molar mass	272.300 g·mol^{−1}

Hazards
- GHS labelling
Pictograms	(GHS07: Exclamation mark) (GHS08: Health hazard)
Signal word	Warning
Hazard statements	H312, H315, H317, H319, H341, H412
Precautionary statements	P203, P261, P264, P264+P265, P272, P273, P280, P302+P352, P305+P351+P338, P317, P318, P321, P333+P317, P337+P317, P362+P364, P405, P501
- Except where otherwise noted, data are given for materials in their standard state (at 25 °C [77 °F], 100 kPa). Infobox references

1,6-Bis(2,3-epoxypropoxy)naphthalene is a naphthalene-type epoxy resin which is used in many industrial applications. Occupational allergic contact dermatitis has been reported.
