= Gnetucleistol E =

- Chemical structure of gnetucleistol E

Names
- IUPAC name 5-[2-(3,4-dimethoxyphenyl)ethenyl]benzene-1,3-diol
- Other names 3-methoxy-isorhapontigenin

Identifiers
CAS Number	629643-27-2
3D model (JSmol)	Interactive image
ChemSpider	23333675
PubChem CID	53395175
UNII	Y5XLT99N4N
- InChI: InChI=1S/C16H16O4/c1-19-15-6-5-11(9-16(15)20-2)3-4-12-7-13(17)10-14(18)8-12/h3-10,17-18H,1-2H3/b4-3+ Key: WHKSEHKYYXHCTA-ONEGZZNKSA-N; InChI=1/C16H16O4/c1-19-15-6-5-11(9-16(15)20-2)3-4-12-7-13(17)10-14(18)8-12/h3-10,17-18H,1-2H3/b4-3+ Key: WHKSEHKYYXHCTA-ONEGZZNKBB
- SMILES: COC1=C(C=C(C=C1)C=CC2=CC(=CC(=C2)O)O)OC

Properties
Chemical formula	C_{16}H_{16}O_{4}
Molar mass	272.300 g·mol^{−1}
- Except where otherwise noted, data are given for materials in their standard state (at 25 °C [77 °F], 100 kPa). Infobox references

Gnetucleistol E is a stilbenoid of the gnetucleistol group found in the Chinese herb Gnetum cleistostachyum.
