= Welwitschiella =

Scientific classification
- Kingdom: Plantae
- Clade: Tracheophytes
- Clade: Angiosperms
- Clade: Eudicots
- Clade: Asterids
- Order: Asterales
- Family: Asteraceae
- Subfamily: Asteroideae
- Tribe: Astereae
- Subtribe: Grangeinae
- Genus: Welwitschiella; O.Hoffm. 1894 not Engl. 1899 (Menispermaceae)
- Species: W. neriifolia

Binomial name
- Welwitschiella neriifolia O.Hoffm.

Genus of flowering plants

Welwitschiella is a genus of African plants in the tribe Astereae within the family Asteraceae.

Species

There is only one known species, Welwitschiella neriifolia, native to Angola, Zaïre, and Zambia.
