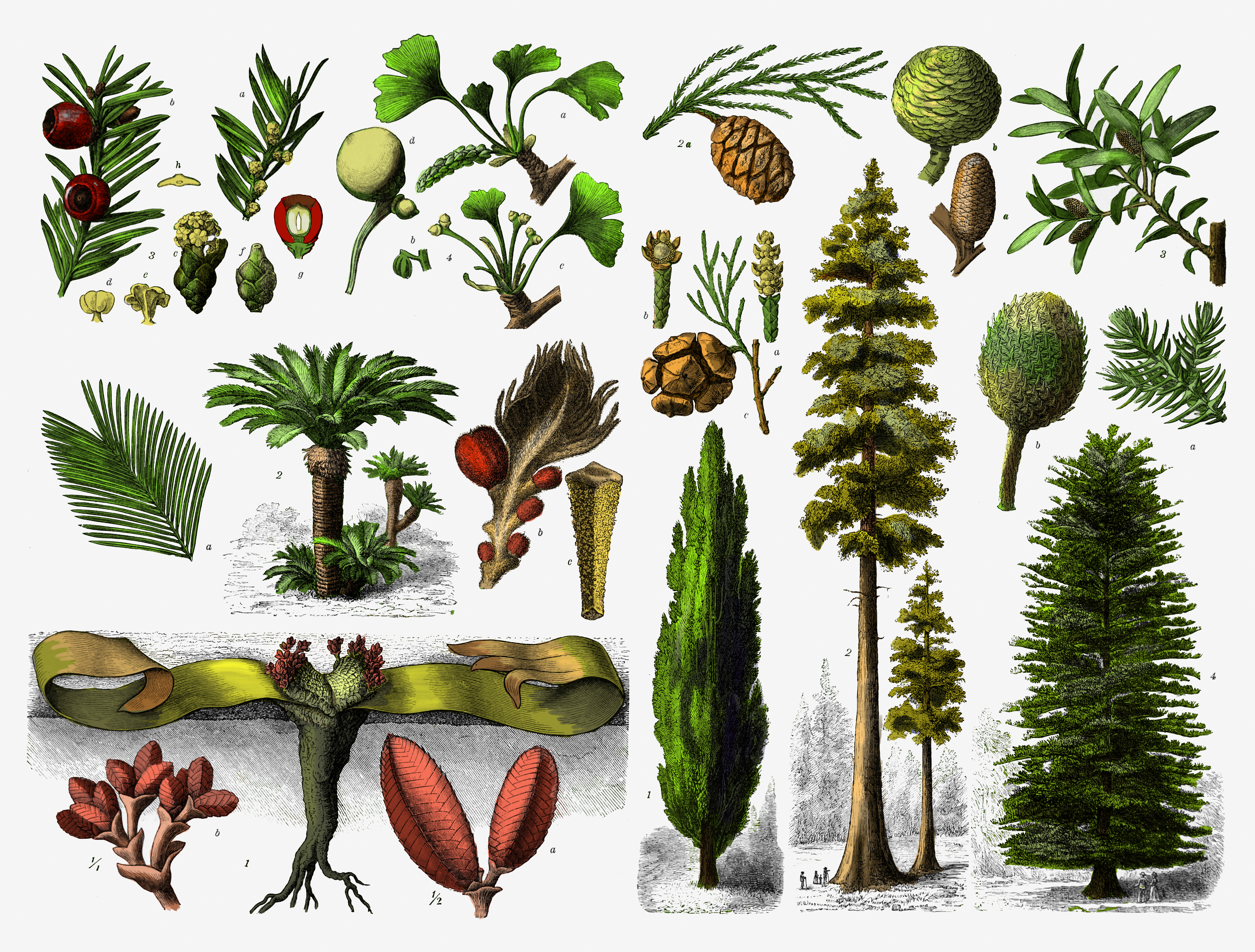
- Various gymnosperms.

Scientific classification
- Kingdom: Plantae
- Clade: Tracheophytes
- Clade: Spermatophytes
- Clade: Gymnosperms

Living orders
- Cycadopsida; Cycadales; Ginkgoopsida; Ginkgoales; Pinopsida; Cupressidae; Araucariales; Cupressales; Pinidae; Pinales; Gnetidae; Ephedrales; Welwitschiales; Gnetales

= Gymnosperm =

Gymnosperm Temporal range: Carboniferous–Present

Clade of non-flowering, naked-seeded vascular plants

The gymnosperms (/ˈdʒɪmnəˌspɜːrmz, -noʊ-/ nə-spurmz, -noh-; from Ancient Greek γυμνός, gymnós 'naked' and σπέρμα, spérma 'seed', thus 'naked seed') are a group of woody, perennial seed-producing plants, typically lacking the protective outer covering which surrounds the seeds in flowering plants, that include conifers, cycads, ginkgos, and gnetophytes, forming the clade Gymnospermae. The name is based on the unenclosed condition of their seeds (called ovules in their unfertilized state). The non-encased condition of their seeds contrasts with the seeds and ovules of flowering plants (angiosperms), which are enclosed within an ovary. Gymnosperm seeds develop either on the surface of scales or leaves, which are often modified to form cones, or on their own as in yew, Torreya, and Ginkgo.

The life cycle of a gymnosperm involves alternation of generations, with a dominant diploid sporophyte phase, and a reduced haploid gametophyte phase, which is dependent on the sporophytic phase. The term "gymnosperm" is often used in paleobotany to refer to (the paraphyletic group of) all non-angiosperm seed plants. In that case, to specify the monophyletic group of living gymnosperms, the term Acrogymnospermae is sometimes used.

The gymnosperms and angiosperms together constitute the spermatophytes or seed plants. The spermatophytes are subdivided into five divisions, the angiosperms and four divisions of gymnosperms: the Cycadophyta, Ginkgophyta, Gnetophyta, and Pinophyta (also known as Coniferophyta). Newer classification place the gnetophytes among the conifers. Numerous extinct seed plant groups are recognised including pteridosperms and the Bennettitales.

By far the largest group of living gymnosperms are the conifers (pines, cypresses, and relatives), followed by cycads, gnetophytes (Gnetum, Ephedra and Welwitschia), and Ginkgo biloba (a single living species). About 65% of gymnosperms are dioecious with male and female individuals, but conifers are almost all monoecious with male and female cones on the same tree. Some genera have ectomycorrhiza fungal associations with roots (Pinus), while in some others (Cycas) small specialised roots called coralloid roots are associated with nitrogen-fixing cyanobacteria.

== Diversity and origin ==
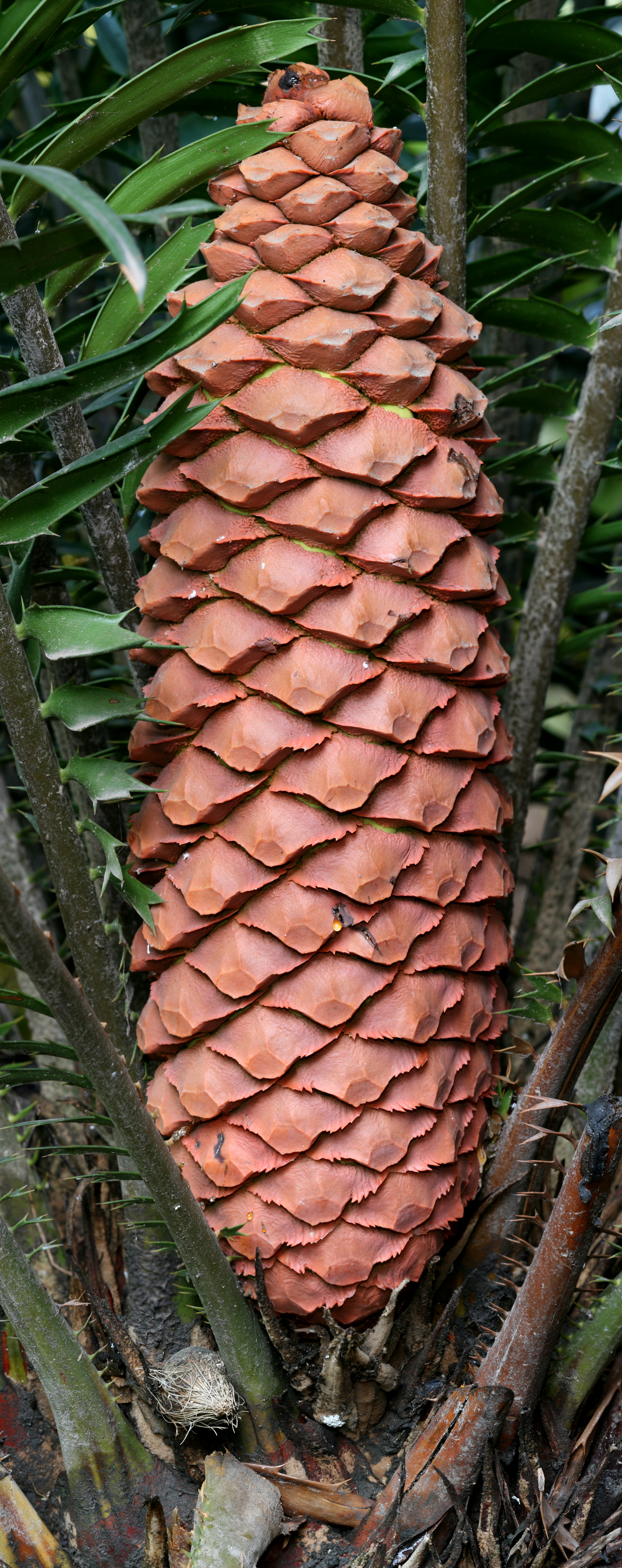
Cone of the cycad Encephalartos sclavoi

Over 1,000 living species of gymnosperm exist. It was previously widely accepted that the gymnosperms originated in the Late Carboniferous period, replacing the lycopsid rainforests of the tropical region, but more recent phylogenetic evidence indicates that they diverged from the ancestors of angiosperms during the Early Carboniferous. The radiation of gymnosperms during the late Carboniferous appears to have resulted from a whole genome duplication event around 319 million years ago. Early characteristics of seed plants are evident in fossil progymnosperms of the late Devonian period around 383 million years ago. It has been suggested that during the mid-Mesozoic era, pollination of some extinct groups of gymnosperms was by extinct species of scorpionflies that had specialized proboscides for feeding on pollination drops. The scorpionflies likely engaged in pollination mutualisms with gymnosperms, long before the similar and independent coevolution of nectar-feeding insects on angiosperms. Some mid-Mesozoic gymnosperms were pollinated by kalligrammatid lacewings.

All gymnosperms are perennial woody plants. Unlike in other extant gymnosperms the soft and highly parenchymatous wood in cycads is poorly lignified, and their main structural support comes from an armor of sclerenchymatous leaf bases covering the stem, with the exception of species with underground stems. There are no herbaceous gymnosperms and compared to angiosperms they occupy fewer ecological niches, but the gymnosperms include parasites (Parasitaxus), epiphytes (Zamia pseudoparasitica), and aquatic rheophytes (Retrophyllum minus).

Conifers are by far the most abundant extant group of gymnosperms with six to eight families, with a total of 65–70 genera and 600–630 species (696 accepted names). Most conifers are evergreens. Conifers produce their seeds inside a protective cone called a strobilus. Most species are monoecious, with male and female cones on the same tree. All conifers are wind-pollinated.

Cycads, small palm-like trees, are the next most abundant group of gymnosperms, with two or three families, 11 genera, and approximately 338 species. A majority of cycads are native to tropical climates and are most abundantly found in regions near the equator. The other extant groups are the 95–100 species of Gnetophytes and one species of Ginkgo. Ginkgos are tall trees with bilobed leaves, while gnetophytes are a diverse groups of plants and shrubs including the horizontally growing Welwitschia.

Gymnosperms are the most threatened of all plant groups.

== Evolution ==
=== Phylogeny ===
The phylogeny of the gymnosperms has been revised by multiple authors.

- Gymnospermae
  - - Ginkgoidae
      Ginkgoaceae
    - Cycadidae
      - Cycadales
        - Cycadaceae
        - Zamiaceae
  - - Pinidae
      - - Gnetales
          - Ephedraceae
          - - Gnetaceae
            - Welwitschiaceae
        - Pinales
          Pinaceae
    - Cupressidae
      - Araucariales
        - Araucariaceae
        - Podocarpaceae
      - Cupressales
        - Sciadopityaceae
        - - Taxaceae
          - Cupressaceae

=== Taxonomy ===
A formal classification of the living gymnosperms is the "Acrogymnospermae", which form a monophyletic group within the spermatophytes. The wider "Gymnospermae" group includes extinct gymnosperms and is thought to be paraphyletic. The fossil record of gymnosperms includes many distinctive taxa that do not belong to the four modern groups, including seed-bearing trees that have a somewhat fern-like vegetative morphology (the "seed ferns" or pteridosperms). The extant gymnosperms include 12 main families and 83 genera which contain more than 1000 known species.

Subclass Cycadidae

- Order Cycadales
  - Family Cycadaceae: Cycas
  - Family Zamiaceae: Dioon, Bowenia, Macrozamia, Lepidozamia, Encephalartos, Stangeria, Ceratozamia, Microcycas, Zamia

Subclass Ginkgoidae

- Order Ginkgoales
  - Family Ginkgoaceae: Ginkgo

Subclass Gnetidae

- Order Welwitschiales
  - Family Welwitschiaceae: Welwitschia
- Order Gnetales
  - Family Gnetaceae: Gnetum
- Order Ephedrales
  - Family Ephedraceae: Ephedra

Subclass Pinidae

- Order Pinales
  - Family Pinaceae: Cedrus, Pinus, Cathaya, Picea, Pseudotsuga, Larix, Pseudolarix, Tsuga, Nothotsuga, Keteleeria, Abies

Subclass Cupressidae

- Order Araucariales
  - Family Araucariaceae: Araucaria, Wollemia, Agathis
  - Family Podocarpaceae: Phyllocladus, Lepidothamnus, Prumnopitys, Sundacarpus, Halocarpus, Parasitaxus, Lagarostrobos, Manoao, Saxegothaea, Microcachrys, Pherosphaera, Acmopyle, Dacrycarpus, Dacrydium, Falcatifolium, Retrophyllum, Nageia, Afrocarpus, Podocarpus
- Order Cupressales
  - Family Sciadopityaceae: Sciadopitys
  - Family Cupressaceae: Cunninghamia, Taiwania, Athrotaxis, Metasequoia, Sequoia, Sequoiadendron, Cryptomeria, Glyptostrobus, Taxodium, Papuacedrus, Austrocedrus, Libocedrus, Pilgerodendron, Widdringtonia, Diselma, Fitzroya, Callitris, Actinostrobus, Neocallitropsis, Thujopsis, Thuja, Fokienia, Chamaecyparis, Cupressus, Juniperus, Calocedrus, Tetraclinis, Platycladus, Microbiota
  - Family Cephalotaxaceae: Cephalotaxus
  - Family Taxaceae: Austrotaxus, Pseudotaxus, Taxus, Amentotaxus, Torreya

=== Extinct groupings ===
- Order Cordaitales
- Order Calamopityales
- Order Callistophytales
- Order Caytoniales
- Order Gigantopteridales
- Order Glossopteridales
- Order Lyginopteridales
- Order Medullosales
- Order Peltaspermales
- Order Corystospermales (also known as Umkomasiales)
- Order Czekanowskiales
- Order Bennettitales (cycadeoids)
- Order Erdtmanithecales
- Order Pentoxylales
- Order Petriellales

== Life cycle ==
A gymnosperm lifecycle, with generations alternating between the diploid tree (the sporophyte), and the haploid pollen grain and ovule (the gametophytes).

Gymnosperms, like all vascular plants, have a sporophyte-dominant life cycle, which means they spend most of their life cycle with diploid cells, while the gametophyte (gamete-bearing phase) is relatively short-lived. Like all seed plants, they are heterosporous, having two spore types, male microspores produced in the microsporangium in a pollen cone, while female megaspores are produced in the megasporangium in an ovulate cone. The microsporangium is carried by a microsporophyll (a modified leaf) in the male cone, and the seeds are carried by ovuliferous scales in the female cone. The exception is the females in the cycad genus Cycas, which form a loose structure called megasporophylls instead of cones. As with all heterosporous plants, the gametophytes develop within the spore wall. Pollen grains (microgametophytes) mature from microspores, and ultimately produce sperm cells. Megagametophytes develop from megaspores and are retained within the ovule. Gymnosperms produce multiple archegonia, which in turn produce the female gametes.

During pollination, pollen grains are physically transferred between plants from the pollen cone to the ovule. Pollen is usually moved by wind or insects. Whole grains enter each ovule through a microscopic gap in the ovule coat (integument) called the micropyle. The pollen grains mature further inside the ovule and produce sperm cells. Two main modes of fertilization are found in gymnosperms. Cycads and Ginkgo have flagellated motile sperm that swim directly to the egg inside the ovule, whereas conifers and gnetophytes have sperm with no flagella that are moved along a pollen tube to the egg. After syngamy (joining of the sperm and egg cell), the zygote develops into an embryo (young sporophyte). More than one embryo is usually initiated in each gymnosperm seed. The mature seed comprises the embryo and the remains of the female gametophyte, which serves as a food supply, and the seed coat.

Gymnosperms ordinarily reproduce by sexual reproduction, and only rarely express parthenogenesis. Sexual reproduction in gymnosperms appears to be required for maintaining long-term genomic integrity. Meiosis in sexual land plants provides a direct mechanism for repairing DNA in reproductive tissues. The likely primary benefit of cross-pollination in gymnosperms, as in other eukaryotes, is that it allows the avoidance of inbreeding depression caused by the presence of recessive deleterious mutations.

== Genetics ==
The first published sequenced genome for any gymnosperm was the genome of Picea abies in 2013.

== Uses ==
Gymnosperms have major economic uses. Some, such as pine, fir, spruce, and cedar, are used for lumber, paper production, and resin. Other common uses for gymnosperms are soap, varnish, nail polish, food, gum, and perfumes.

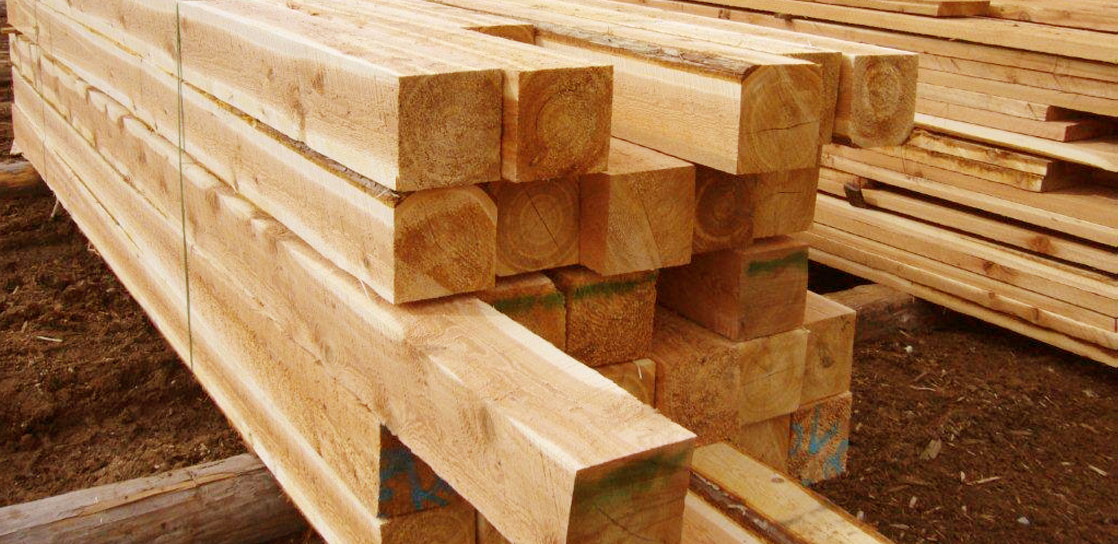
Cedar timber

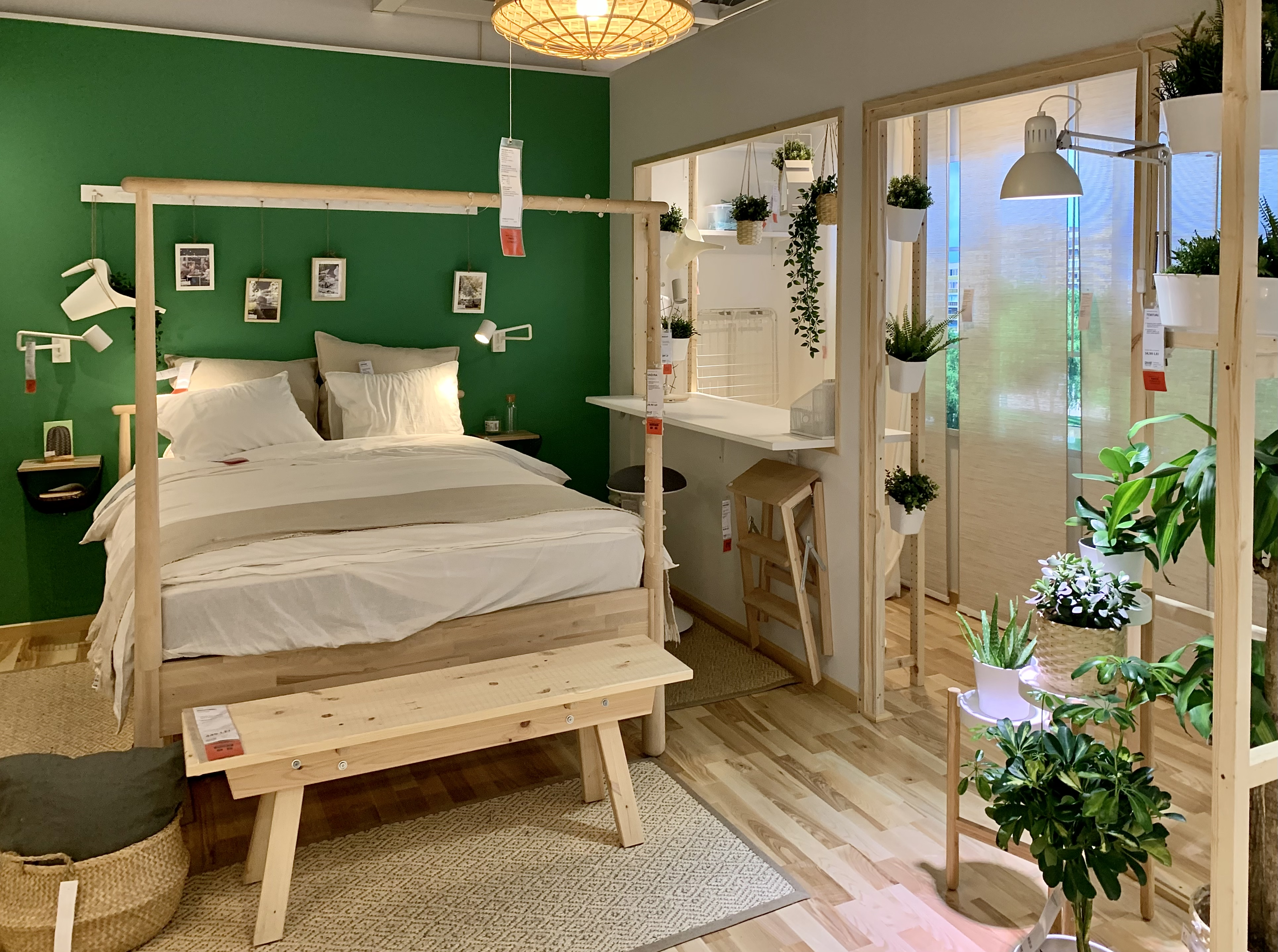
Pine furniture

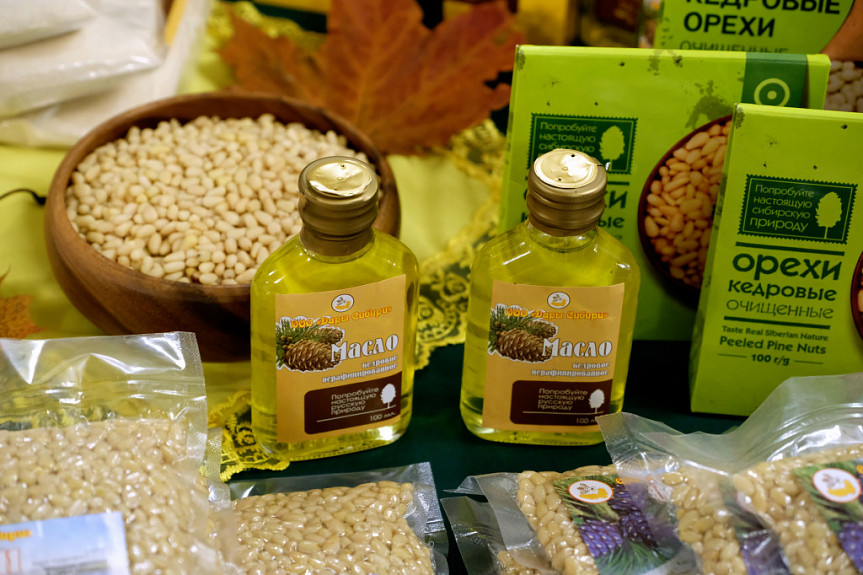
Shelled pine nuts, cedar oil

Harvesting pine resin
