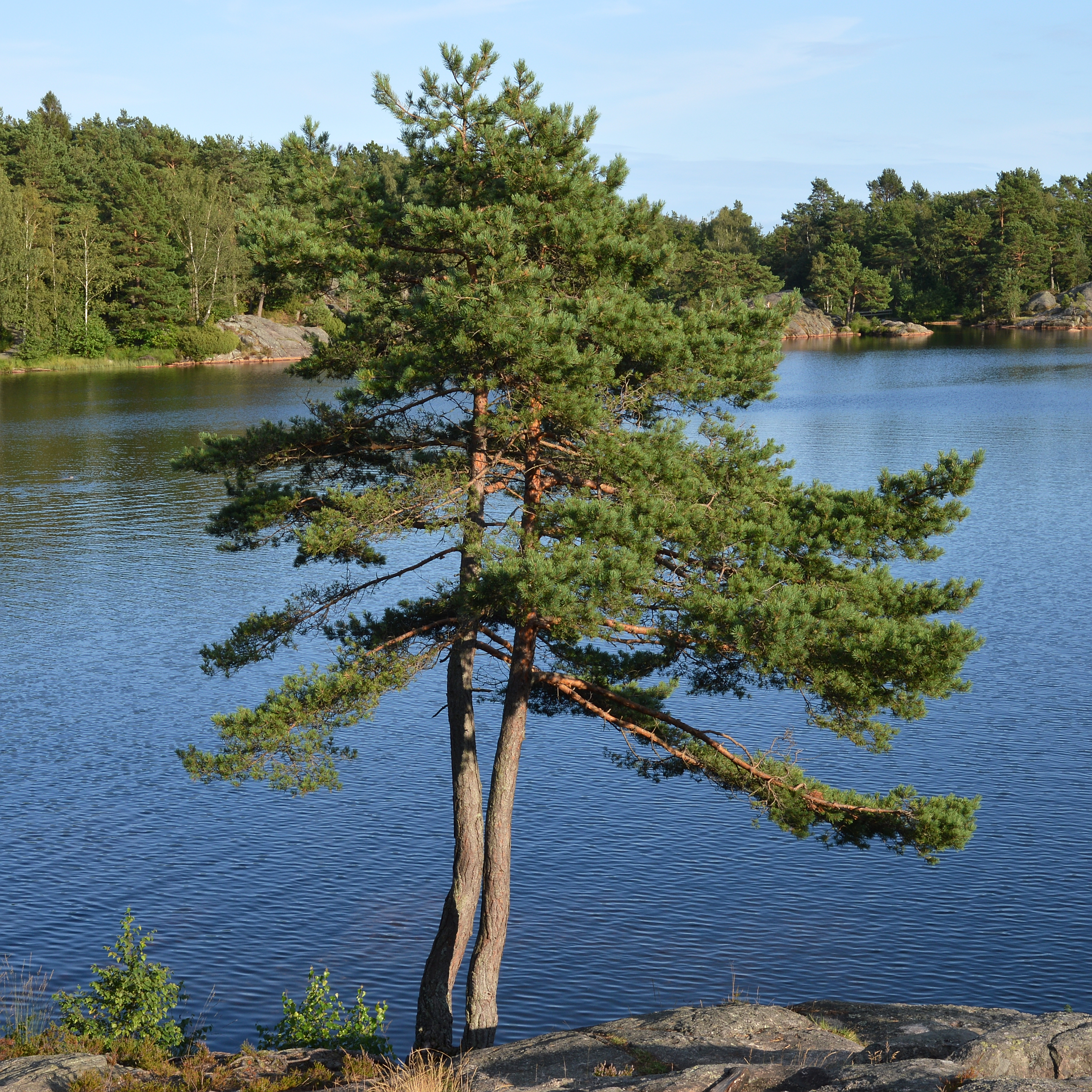
- Pinus sylvestris

Scientific classification
- Kingdom: Plantae
- Clade: Tracheophytes
- Clade: Gymnosperms
- Division: Pinophyta
- Class: Pinopsida
- Subclass: Pinidae
- Order: Pinales; Christenhusz

Type genus
- Pinus L.

Families and Subfamilies
- Pinaceae; Abietoideae; Pinoideae

= Pinales =

Order of conifers

The order Pinales in the subclass Pinidae, in the class Pinopsida, which some authorities consider a monotypic order which comprises only one family, the pine family Pinaceae. The name Pinales has historically been used to refer to all conifers, the term being used interchangeably with an order named 'coniferales', which was widely accepted until at least 2011. Subsequent analyses have recognised not one but three orders of conifers: Pinales, Cupressales, and Araucariales. These are widely accepted since at least 2022.

== Taxonomy ==
=== History ===
Brown (1825) (Note: Read before the Linnean Society in 1825, published in 1826) first discerned that there were two groups of seed plants, distinguished by the form of seed development, based on whether the ovules were exposed, receiving pollen directly, or enclosed, which do not. Shortly afterwards, Brongniart (1828) coined the term Phanérogames gymnosperms (Note: Phanerogam, or seed plant, indicating visible sexual organs, and gymnosperm indicating exposed seeds) to describe the former group. The distinction was then formalized by Lindley (1830), dividing what he referred to as the subclass Dicotyledons into two tribes, Gymnosperms and Angiosperms. (Note: Angiosperm indicating enclosed seeds) In the gymnosperms (or Gymnospermae) Lindley included two orders, the Cycadeae and the Coniferae. In his final work (1853) he described Gymnogens as a class with four orders;

- Cycadeaceae (cycads)
- Pinaceae (conifers)
- Taxaceae (taxads)
- Gnetaceae

In contrast, Bentham and Hooker (1880) included only three orders in the class Gymnospermeae, by including taxads within Coniferae;

- Gnetaceae
- Coniferae
- Cycadaceae

In the Engler system (1903) Gymnospermae is listed as a subdivision (Unterabteilung) and adopted more of a splitter approach, including extinct taxa, with the following six classes;

- Cycadales
- Bennettitales
- Cordaitales
- Ginkgoales
- Coniferae
- Gnetales

During this period, Gorozhankin published his treatise on Gymnosperms (1895), for which he bears the botanical authority for Pinales, Gorozh.. In his classification, Gymnospermae (alternatively named Archespermae) was a class of the division Archegoniatae, divided into subclasses;

- Cycadoideae
- Peucideae (Coniferae)

A system of two groups was maintained by the most commonly used classification in the twentieth century, the revision of the Engler system by Pilger (1926), who grouped 12 families of the Gymnospermae subdivision into 2 classes;

- Coniferales (Coniferae)
- Gnetales

The treatment of Gymnosperms as two groups, though with varying composition and names, was followed for most of the twentieth century, including the systems of Chamberlain (1935), Benson (1957) and Cronquist (1960).

In the latter, Cronquist divided Gymnospermae into two divisions;

- division Coniferophyta
  - class Coniferae
  - class Chlamydospermae (Gnetales)
- division Cycadophyta
  - class Cycadae

Benson,(1957) who introduced the term Pinales, divided gymnosperms into four classes;

- Conopsida (conifers, including Pinales)
- Ephedropsida
- Gnetopsida
- Cycadopsida

In a later revision, in collaboration with two other taxonomists (1966), Cronquist merged all the gymnosperms into a single division, Pinophyta, with three subdivisions reflecting the main lineages;

- Cycadicae
- Pinicae
- Gneticae

In the era of molecular phylogenetics, De-Zhi and colleagues (2004) once again proposed a division of 12 gymnosperm families into two classes;

- Cycadopsida
  - order Cycadales
- Coniferopsida
  - subclass Multinervidae (6 orders)
  - subclass Taxidae
    - order Taxales
    - order Pinales

With the development of the Angiosperm Phylogeny Group came a major realignment of the linear classification of the land plants, by Chase and Reveal (2009). In this system, the land plants form a class, Equisetopsida s.l. (sensu lato) or sensu Chase & Reveal, (Note: This term should not be confused with Equisetopsida sensu stricto when used as a class of ferns, synonymous with Equisetidae) also known as embryophytes or Embryophyceae nom. illeg.. Class Equisetopsida s.l. is divided into 14 subclades as subclasses, including Magnoliidae (angiosperms). The gymnosperms are represented by four of these subclasses, placing them in a sister group relationship to angiosperms. Subclasses (number of orders);

- subclass Cycadidae Pax (1)
- subclass Ginkgooidae Engl. (1)
- subclass Gnetidae Pax (3)
- subclass Pinidae Cronquist, Takht. & Zimmerm. (conifers) (1)

=== Controversies ===
Gymnosperm (Acrogymnospermae) taxonomy has been considered controversial, and lacks consensus. As taxonomic classification transformed from being based solely on plant morphology to molecular phylogenetics, the number of taxonomic publications increased considerably after 2008, however, these approaches have not been uniform. A taxonomic classification has been complicated by the relationship of extant to extinct taxa, and within extinct taxa, and particularly the placement of Gnetophyta. The latter have been variously classified as basal to all gymnosperms, sister group to conifers (the 'gnetifer' hypothesis) or sister to Pinaceae (the gnepine hypothesis) in which they are classified within the conifers. The extant conifers most likely form a monophyletic group. In 2018, the Gymnosperm Phylogeny Group was established, analogous to the Angiosperm Phylogeny Group and Pteridophyte Phylogeny Group, with the intention of reaching a consensus.

=== Phylogeny ===
Gymnosperms form a group of four subclasses among the spermatophytes (seed bearing plants). In turn, the seed plants together with the monilophyte fern subclasses make up the tracheophytes (vascular plants), part of the class Equisetopsida (embryophytes or land plants), as opposed to the green algae. Among the seed plants, the gymnosperms are a sister group to the subclass Magnoliidae (angiosperms or flowering plants).

There are about 1000 extant gymnosperm species, distributed over about 12 families and 83 genera. Many of these genera are monotypic (41%), and another 27% are oligotypic (2–5 species). The four subclasses have also been treated as divisions of the Spermatophytes. Alternative names and the approximate number of genera and species in each are;

- Cycadidae (Cycadophyta, cycads 10, 300)
- Ginkgoidae (Ginkgophyta, ginkgo 1, 1)
- Gnetidae (Gnetophyta 3, 100)
- Pinidae (Pinophyta, conifers 70, 600)

The term Pinophyta has also been used to include all conifers, extinct and extant, with Pinales representing all the extant conifers.

Christenhusz and colleagues extended the system of Chase and Reveal to provide a revised classification of gymnosperms in 2011, based on the above four subclades. In this scheme, the Pinidae comprise three orders, including Pinales, and 6 families;

- Pinales Gorozh. (Pinaceae)
- Araucariales Gorozh. (Araucariaceae, Podocarpaceae)
- Cupressales Link (Sciadopityaceae, Cupressaceae, Taxaceae)

However, the exact phylogeny remained a topic that was 'hotly debated", in particular whether the main lineages were best represented by the four subclasses of Christenhusz and colleagues or the more traditional five clades (cycads, ginkgos, cupressophytes, Pinaceae and gnetophytes). In 2014 the first complete molecular phylogeny was published, based on 90 species representing all extant genera. This established cycads as the basal group, followed by Ginkgoaceae, as sister to the remaining gymnosperms, and supporting the 'gnepine' hypothesis. This analysis favours the five clade hypothesis, the remaining clade following divergence of the Pinidae, are referred to as the conifer II clade, or cupressophytes, in distinction from the conifer I clade (Gnetidae, Pinidae). This clade, in turn, has two lineages. The first consisting of Sciadopityaceae and the Araucariales, the second being the Cupressales. In the Christenhusz scheme, the Sciadopityaceae were considered to be within Cupressales. The term Cupressaceae s.l. refers to the inclusion of Taxodiaceae. These relationships are shown in this cladogram, although no formal taxonomic revision was undertaken.

Phylogeny of Gymnosperms, subclasses, orders, families

- Gymnosperms
  - Cycadidae (Cycadales)
  - - - - - Ginkgoidae (Ginkgoales)
        - - - Pinidae (Pinales)
            - - - Gnetidae
              - - Sciadopityaceae
                - - Araucariales
                    - Araucariaceae
                    - Podocarpaceae
                  - Cupressales
                    - Taxaceae (including Cephalotaxaceae)
                    - Cupressaceae

A more comprehensive analysis was undertaken by Ran and colleagues in 2018, as part of a detailed phylogeny of all seed plants. This forms the basis of the Tracheophyte Phylogeny Poster and the Angiosperm Phylogeny Website.

=== Subdivision ===
Historically conifers, in the order Pinales have been considered to consist of six to seven extant families, based on the classification of class Coniferae by Pilger (1926), considered the standard through most of the twentieth century. These families were treated as a single order, in distinction to some earlier systems. His families were;

- Araucariaceae
- Cupressaceae (cypresses, juniper, redwood)
- Pinaceae (firs, pines, cedars, larch, spruce)
- Podocarpaceae
- Taxaceae (yews)
- Cephalotaxaceae
- Taxodiaceae

Subsequent revisions merged the Taxodiaceae and Cupressaceae, and placed Sciadopitys, formerly in Cupressaceae, into a separate family (Sciadopityaceae). Cephalotaxaceae had previously been recognized as a separate family, but was subsequently included in Taxaceae. Similarly Phyllocladaceae were included in Podocarpaceae. Yews (Taxaceae) have sometimes been treated as a separate order (Taxales).

Christenhusz and colleagues (2011) included only one family in Pinales, Pinaceae, a practice subsequently followed by the Angiosperm Phylogeny Website and the Gymnosperm Database. In this restricted model Pinales (Pinaceae) comprises 11 genera and about 225 species, all of the other conifers originally included in this order, being included in other orders such as Cupressales.

== Bibliography ==
=== Books ===
- Anderson, John Malcolm; Anderson, Heidi M.; Cleal, Christopher J. (2007). Brief History of the Gymnosperms: Classification, Biodiversity, Phytogeography and Ecology. South African National Biodiversity Institute. ISBN 978-1-919976-39-6.
- Benson, Lyman David (1957). Plant Classification. Heath.
  - Benson, Lyman David (1979). Plant Classification (2nd) ed.). Heath. ISBN 978-0-669-01489-1.
- Bentham, G.; Hooker, J.D. (1862–1883). "Gymnospermeae". Genera plantarum ad exemplaria imprimis in herbariis kewensibus servata definita (3 vols.) (in Latin). Vol. 3(1) 1880. London: L Reeve & Co. pp. 417–447.
- Brongniart, Adolphe (1828–1837). Histoire des végétaux fossiles, ou, Recherches botaniques et géologiques sur les végétaux renfermés dans les diverses couches du globe 2 vols. Vol. i 1828. Paris: G. Dufour et Ed. d'Ocagne. p. 22.
- Eckenwalder, James E. (2009). Conifers of the World: The Complete Reference. Timber Press. ISBN 978-0-88192-974-4.
- Engler, Adolf (1903) [1892]. "Gymnospermae". Syllabus der Pflanzenfamilien: eine Übersicht über das gesamte Pflanzensystem mit Berücksichtigung der Medicinal- und Nutzpflanzen nebst einer Übersicht über die Florenreiche und Florengebiete der Erde zum Gebrauch bei Vorlesungen und Studien über specielle und medicinisch-pharmaceutische Botanik (in German) (3rd ed.). Berlin: Gebrüder Borntraeger Verlag. pp. 70–75.
- Engler, Adolf; Prantl, Karl, eds. (1924) [1887–1915]. Die natürlichen Pflanzenfamilien nebst ihren Gattungen und wichtigeren Arten, insbesondere den Nutzpflanzen, unter Mitwirkung zahlreicher hervorragender Fachgelehrten (in German). Vol. 21 parts (Abteilungen) (2nd ed.). Berlin: Duncker & Humblot., see also Die Natürlichen Pflanzenfamilien
  - Pilger, Robert (1926). Klasse Coniferae. pp. 121–403., in Engler & Prantl (1924) vol. 13 Gymnospermae
- Debreczy, Zsolt; Rácz, István (2011). Conifers Around the World: Conifers of the Temperate Zones and Adjacent Regions. DendroPress. ISBN 978-963-219-061-7.
- Farjon, Aljos (2001) [1998]. World Checklist and Bibliography of Conifers (2nd ed.). Royal Botanic Gardens, Kew. ISBN 978-1-84246-025-2.
- — (2010). A Handbook of the World's Conifers (2 Vols.). Brill. ISBN 978-90-04-17718-5.
- —; Filer, Denis (2013). An Atlas of the World's Conifers: An Analysis of their Distribution, Biogeography, Diversity and Conservation Status. Brill. ISBN 978-90-04-21181-0.
- Gorozhankin, Ivan Nikolaevich [in Russian] (1904). Лекции по морфологии и систематики архегониальных растений (Lekts. Morf. Sist. Archegon. Lectures on the morphology and taxonomy of archegonial plants) (in Russian). Moscow: Русская" типо-литография. p. 88., see also Горожанкин, Иван Николаевич (1895). Морфология и систематика архегониальных растений: лекции профессора И.Н. Горожанкина 1894-95 г. Gymnaspermae (Archispermae). Часть III. "Русская" типо-литография.
- Lindley, John (1830). "General view". An introduction to the natural system of botany: or, A systematic view of the organisation, natural affinities, and geographical distribution, of the whole vegetable kingdom: together with the uses of the most important species in medicine, the arts, and rural or domestic economy (1st ed.). London: Longman. p. xxxv.
- Lindley, John (1853) [1846]. "Gymnogens". The Vegetable Kingdom: or, The structure, classification, and uses of plants, illustrated upon the natural system (3rd. ed.). London: Bradbury & Evans. pp. 221–234.
- Plomion, Christophe; Bousquet, Jean; Kole, Chittaranjan, eds. (2011). Genetics, Genomics and Breeding of Conifers. CRC Press. ISBN 978-1-57808-719-8.
  - Gernandt, David S; Willyard, Ann; Syring, John V; Liston, Aaron (2011). The Conifers (Pinophyta). pp. 1–39., in Plomion et al (2011)

=== Encyclopaedias ===
- Delevoryas, T (13 April 2015). "Gymnosperm". Encyclopædia Britannica.
- Eckenwalder, James Emory (3 September 2008). "Conifer". Encyclopædia Britannica.

=== Articles ===
- Brown, Robert (31 May 1826). "LIV. Character and description of Kingia, a new genus of plants found on the South-west coast of New Holland: with observations on the structure of its unimpregnated ovulum; and on the female flower of Cycadeœ and Coniferœ". The Philosophical Magazine. 67 (337): 352–361. doi:10.1080/14786442608674070.
- Brunsfeld, Steven J.; Soltis, Pamela S.; Soltis, Douglas E.; Gadek, Paul A.; Quinn, Christopher J.; Strenge, Darren D.; Ranker, Tom A. (April 1994). "Phylogenetic Relationships Among the Genera of Taxodiaceae and Cupressaceae: Evidence from rbcL Sequences". Systematic Botany. 19 (2): 253. Bibcode:1994SysBo..19..253B. doi:10.2307/2419600. JSTOR 2419600.
- Chamberlain, Charles Joseph (June 1935). "The Gymnosperms" (PDF). The Botanical Review. 1 (6): 183–209. Bibcode:1935BotRv...1..183C. doi:10.1007/BF02872502. S2CID 39793752.
- Chase, Mark W; Reveal, James L (2009). "A phylogenetic classification of the land plants to accompany APG III". Botanical Journal of the Linnean Society. 161 (2): 122–127. doi:10.1111/j.1095-8339.2009.01002.x.
- Christenhusz, M. J. M.; Reveal, J. L.; Farjon, A.; Gardner, M. F.; Mill, R. R.; Chase, M. W. (18 February 2011). "A new classification and linear sequence of extant gymnosperms" (PDF). Phytotaxa. 19 (1): 55–70. Bibcode:2011Phytx..19...55C. doi:10.11646/phytotaxa.19.1.3. S2CID 86797396.
- Cronquist, Arthur (October 1960). "The divisions and classes of plants". The Botanical Review. 26 (4): 425–482. Bibcode:1960BotRv..26..425C. doi:10.1007/BF02940572. S2CID 43144314.
- Cronquist, Arthur; Takhtajan, Armen; Zimmermann, Walter (1966). "On the Higher Taxa of Embryobionta" (PDF). Taxon. 15 (4): 129–134. Bibcode:1966Taxon..15..129C. doi:10.2307/1217531. JSTOR 1217531.
- Davy, J. Burtt (1937). "The classification of Coniferae II". Forestry: An International Journal of Forest Research. 11 (2): 122–123. doi:10.1093/oxfordjournals.forestry.a062697.
- De-Zhi, Fu; Yong, Yang; Guang-Hua, Zhu (2004). "A New Scheme of Classification of Living Gymnosperms at Family Level". Kew Bulletin. 59 (1): 111. Bibcode:2004KewBu..59..111D. doi:10.2307/4111081. JSTOR 4111081.
- De La Torre, Amanda R.; Piot, Anthony; Liu, Bobin; Wilhite, Benjamin; Weiss, Matthew; Porth, Ilga (January 2020). "Functional and morphological evolution in gymnosperms: A portrait of implicated gene families". Evolutionary Applications. 13 (1): 210–227. Bibcode:2020EvApp..13..210D. doi:10.1111/eva.12839. PMC 6935586. PMID 31892953.
- Farjon, Aljos (26 March 2018). "The Kew Review: Conifers of the World". Kew Bulletin. 73 (1) 8. Bibcode:2018KewBu..73....8F. doi:10.1007/s12225-018-9738-5.
- Lu, Ying; Ran, Jin-Hua; Guo, Dong-Mei; Yang, Zu-Yu; Wang, Xiao-Quan (15 September 2014). "Phylogeny and Divergence Times of Gymnosperms Inferred from Single-Copy Nuclear Genes". PLoS ONE. 9 (9) e107679. Bibcode:2014PLoSO...9j7679L. doi:10.1371/journal.pone.0107679. PMC 4164646. PMID 25222863.
- Ran, Jin-Hua; Shen, Ting-Ting; Wang, Ming-Ming; Wang, Xiao-Quan (27 June 2018). "Phylogenomics resolves the deep phylogeny of seed plants and indicates partial convergent or homoplastic evolution between Gnetales and angiosperms". Proceedings of the Royal Society B: Biological Sciences. 285 (1881) 20181012. Bibcode:2018PBioS.28581012R. doi:10.1098/rspb.2018.1012. PMC 6030518. PMID 29925623.
- Ran, Jin-Hua; Shen, Ting-Ting; Wu, Hui; Gong, Xun; Wang, Xiao-Quan (December 2018). "Phylogeny and evolutionary history of Pinaceae updated by transcriptomic analysis". Molecular Phylogenetics and Evolution. 129: 106–116. Bibcode:2018MolPE.129..106R. doi:10.1016/j.ympev.2018.08.011. PMID 30153503. S2CID 52110440.
- Reveal, James L (August 1995). "Newly required suprageneric names in Magnoliophyta". Phytologia. 79 (2): 68–76.
- Tomlinson, P. B. (2012). "Rescuing Robert Brown—The Origins of Angio-Ovuly in Seed Cones of Conifers". Botanical Review. 78 (4): 310–334. Bibcode:2012BotRv..78..310T. doi:10.1007/s12229-012-9104-5. JSTOR 41809857. S2CID 5403322.
- Wang, Xiao-Quan; Ran, Jin-Hua (June 2014). "Evolution and biogeography of gymnosperms". Molecular Phylogenetics and Evolution. 75: 24–40. Bibcode:2014MolPE..75...24W. doi:10.1016/j.ympev.2014.02.005. PMID 24565948. S2CID 4662571.

=== Websites ===
- Cole, Theodor C. H.; Bachelier, Julien B (October 2019). "Tracheophyte Phylogeny Poster - Vascular Plants: Systematics and Characteristics, 2019". Dahlem Centre of Plant Sciences (DCPS), Institute of Biology – Botany, Freie Universität Berlin.
- Stevens, P.F. (2020) [2001]. "Pinales". AP Web v. 14. Missouri Botanical Garden. (see also Angiosperm Phylogeny Website)
- Earle, Christopher J. (2020). "The Gymnosperm Database".
- Nagalingum, Nathalie; Burleigh, Gordon (2018). "The Gymnosperm Phylogeny Group". Botany 2018 (Abstract). Botanical Society of America.
- Eckenwalder, James E (2007). "Gymnosperm classification". Flora of North America. Volume 1, Chapter 13.
