= DCPS =

DCPS may refer to:

- Dahlem Centre of Plant Sciences, a research focus area of Freie Universität Berlin, Germany
- DCPS (gene), a human gene that encodes the scavenger mRNA-decapping enzyme DcpS
- DCPS (TV channel), a public-access television station based in Duval County, Florida
- Distributed cyber-physical system, a cyber-physical system which involves extensive distributed computation
- District of Columbia Public Schools, which operates the public schools in Washington, DC
- Dominican Convent Primary School, Bulawayo, an independent school in Bulawayo, Zimbabwe
- Dulwich College Preparatory School, a private school in the United Kingdom
- Duval County Public Schools, which operates public schools in Jacksonville, Florida
- M7GpppX diphosphatase, an enzyme

It might also be used for

- Miami-Dade County Public Schools
