= Magnoliidae =

Magnoliidae is a botanical subclass name; it may refer to:

- Magnoliids, a major group of basal angiosperms.
- Magnoliidae sensu Chase & Reveal, a botanical subclass consisting of all angiosperms.
- In the Dahlgren and Thorne systems, a group consisting of the Dicotyledons (Class Magnoliopsida in the Cronquist system)
