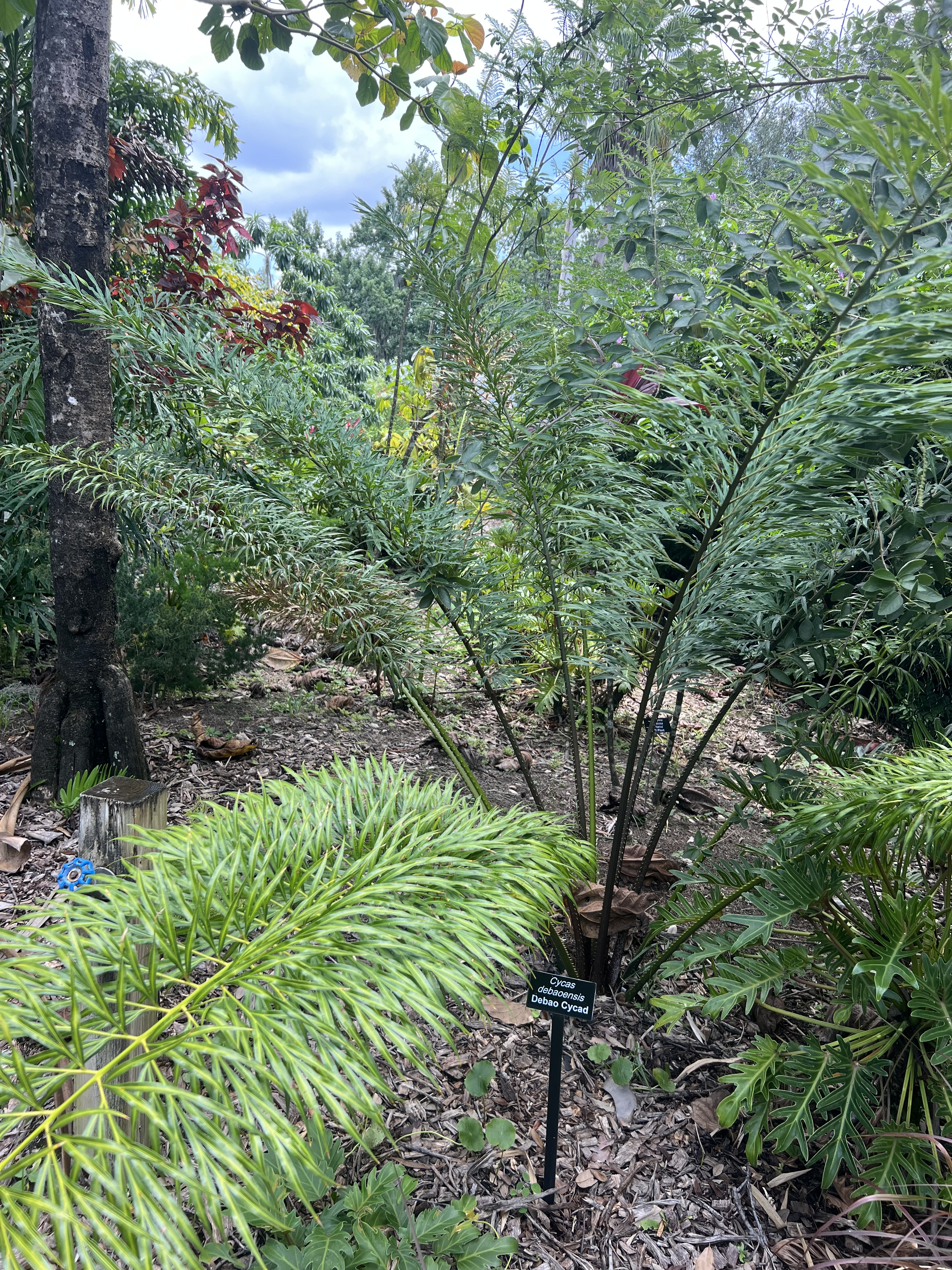

Conservation status
- Critically Endangered (IUCN 3.1)

Scientific classification
- Kingdom: Plantae
- Clade: Embryophytes
- Clade: Tracheophytes
- Clade: Spermatophytes
- Clade: Gymnospermae
- Division: Cycadophyta
- Class: Cycadopsida
- Order: Cycadales
- Family: Cycadaceae
- Genus: Cycas
- Species: C. debaoensis

Binomial name
- Cycas debaoensis Y.C.Zhong & C.J.Chen

= Cycas debaoensis =

Debao cycad

Species of cycad

Cycas debaoensis is a plant species endemic to the Guangxi region of China. It grows in sunny locations at elevations of 700–1000 m. It is closely related to Cycas multipinnata.

== Description ==
Cycas debaoensis has a trunk that shows up to 70 cm above ground. Leaves are tripinnate with spines along the rachis. Seeds are green, yellow, or brown, 3–4 cm across.

== Distribution ==
Cycas debaoensis is found in:

- Fuping Village 扶平村 in Debao County
- near Dingye 定业乡 in Napo County
- near Banshui 泮水乡 in Baise City
- near Gula 谷拉乡 in Funing County
