= Fossil Cycad National Monument =

National monument in South Dakota, US

Coordinates: 43°23′42″N 103°43′35″W

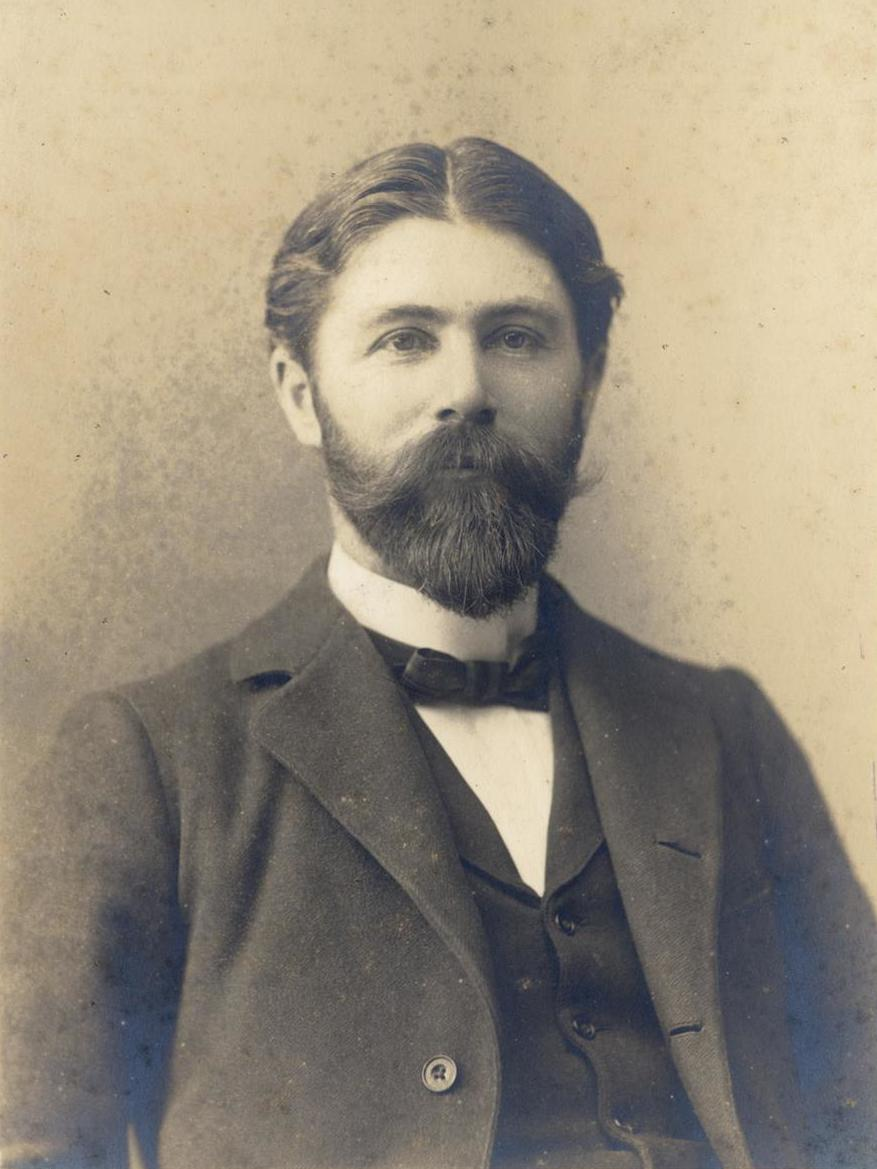
Paleobotanist George Wieland before 1920

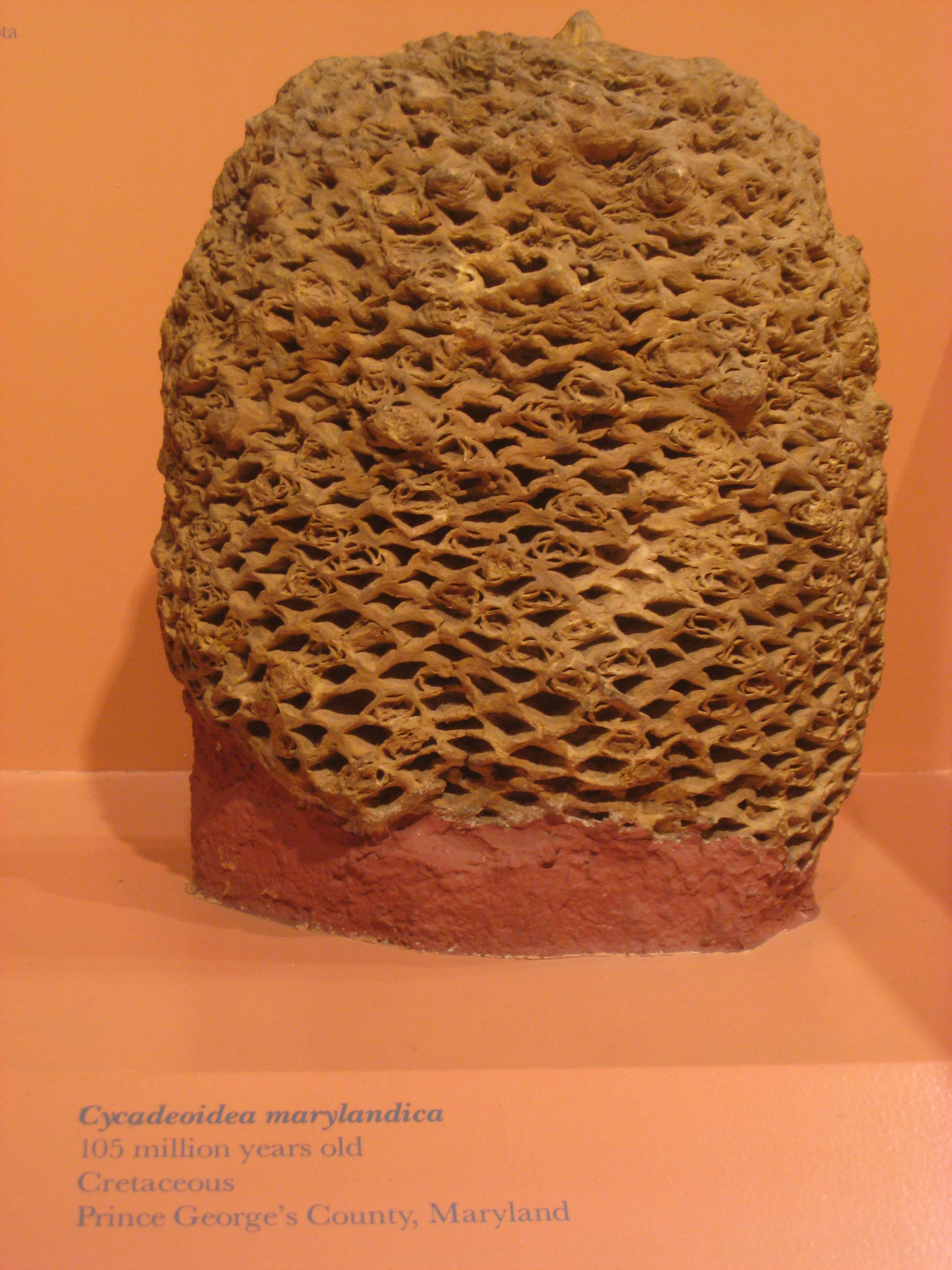
Fossil of Cycadeoidea

Fossil Cycad National Monument was a national monument in the U.S. state of South Dakota beginning in 1922. The site contained hundreds of fossils of the cycad-like bennettitalean plant Cycadeoidea, one of the world's greatest concentrations. Because vandals stole or destroyed all of the visible fossils, it was withdrawn as a national monument in 1957. It is located in northwestern Fall River County, on U.S. Route 18, northeast of the city of Edgemont.

Despite the name of the National Monument, Cycadeoidea- the most common fossil at the site- was not in fact a true cycad but a member of the Bennettitales, a different, now-extinct order of plants only distantly related to cycads.

== Discovery ==
Life restoration of Cycadeoidea

The fossilized cycadeoid beds were discovered in 1892 by F. H. Cole of Hot Springs, South Dakota, in the 120-million-year-old Dakota Sandstone Formation, near Minnekahta. Cole sent photographs of the fossils to Professor Henry Newton, a geologist at the Smithsonian Institution. Professor Thomas MacBride of the University of Iowa published the first description of the site in 1893. There were believed to be large deposits of Cretaceous cycad fossils. A few years earlier, ranchers in the area were unearthing fossil cycadeoids, which were described as prehistoric pineapples by them, to be sold off as curiosities. This practice was stopped due to the intervention of the University of Iowa, the Smithsonian and various institutions.

In 1920, Yale paleobotanist George Reber Wieland obtained the fossil-rich land under the Homestead Act "in order that the cycads might not fall into unworthy hands". Two years later he offered to return the land to the federal government if a national monument could be established to protect the fossils.

== Establishment of the national monument ==
The original monument was established on October 21, 1922, through Proclamation 1641 of President Warren G. Harding. It encompassed 1.3 km^{2} (320 acres) at the south entrance to the Black Hills of South Dakota. It was said to be "probably one of the most interesting fossil-plant beds yet discovered, with the most perfectly preserved specimens, and is known to scientific people throughout the world." It was the third American monument designed to protect its fossils, most notably the Cretaceous-aged fossils. The superintendent at Wind Cave National Park was given jurisdiction over the new national monument, but day-to-day supervision was left to local ranchers.

== Deauthorization of the monument ==
Even before formal approval of the new national monument, all of the visible fossils had been removed, many by Yale University paleontologist George Wieland, due to the fact that no administrator for supervising the area had been assigned. Excavations in the 1930s uncovered many new fossils which were also removed by Wieland, including one fossil cycadeoid put on display at the 1933 World's Fair which was eventually lost and never recovered. Wieland wrote several scientific papers based on the fossils he unearthed. A few other paleontologists also wrote papers about the fossil plants unearthed there. The site was retained for some years in the expectation that erosion would uncover new fossils. In the 1940s, things took a turn for the worse for Fossil Cycad National Monument. Erosion and neglect had destroyed most of the fossils in that region until there were few or no fossils left. There were plans to help restore the area to its natural beauty, but this did not happen, and on September 1, 1957, Fossil Cycad National Monument was transferred to the Bureau of Land Management.

In 1980, construction of a highway through the site uncovered more fossil cycads. The site was nominated as an Area of Critical Environmental Concern in 1997. While the monument is no more, many of the cycadeoids excavated from that area are still in existence and are on display at various scientific institutions such as Yale University, the Smithsonian, and South Dakota School of Mines and Technology.

== Legacy ==
Nowadays, Fossil Cycad National Monument serves as an historic example of how poor planning, poor management, lack of supervision, and non-existent federal enforcement against theft on public lands can spell disaster for an area of land intended to be preserved from development. The downfall of Fossil Cycad National Monument also serves as a reminder for better park management and for assurance that past mistakes are not repeated.
