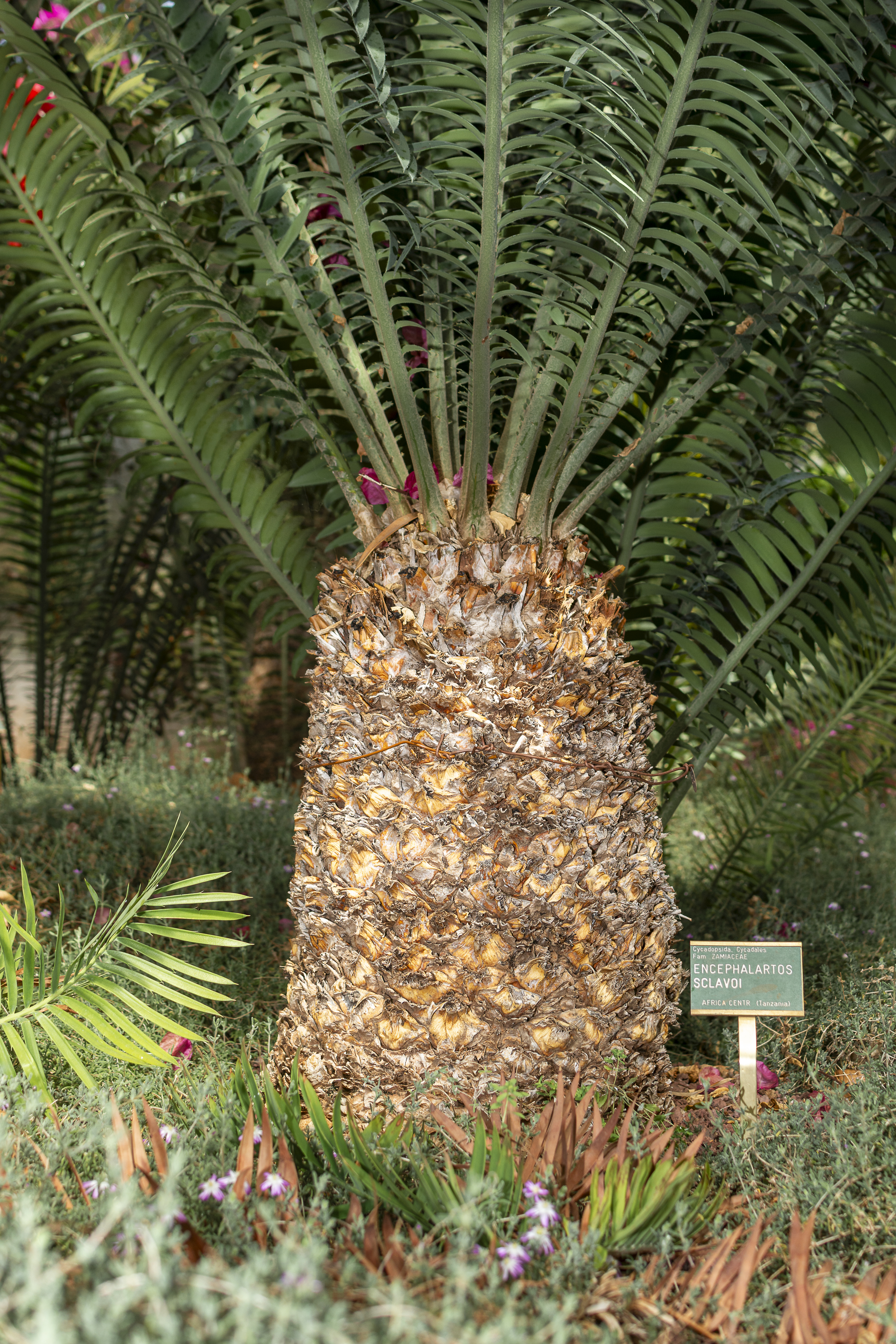
- Specimen of Encephalartos sclavoi cultivated in France.

Conservation status
- Critically Endangered (IUCN 3.1)
- CITES Appendix I

Scientific classification
- Kingdom: Plantae
- Clade: Embryophytes
- Clade: Tracheophytes
- Clade: Spermatophytes
- Clade: Gymnosperms
- Division: Cycadophyta
- Class: Cycadopsida
- Order: Cycadales
- Family: Zamiaceae
- Genus: Encephalartos
- Species: E. sclavoi

Binomial name
- Encephalartos sclavoi De Luca, D.W.Stev. & A.Moretti, 1990

= Encephalartos sclavoi =

Sclavo's cycad

Species of cycad

Encephalartos sclavoi, common name Sclavo's cycad, is a critically endangered cycad in the family Zamiaceae. It is endemic to the Uluguru Mountains of Tanzania, with a population of only ~50 mature plants. Having existed for millions of years, it is often dubbed "living fossils".

== Description ==
Encephalartos sclavoi grows to about 1 metre (3.3 ft) high. The leaves are 170 to 200 centimetres (5.6 to 6.6 ft) long, dark green and semiglossy. Its seed cones are yellow, being 30 to 40 centimetres (12 to 16 in) long and 15 to 20 centimetres (5.9 to 7.9 in) in diameter. Its leaflets are concave and heavily spined.

It grows in two varieties: green emergent, less spiny and straighter leaves; and reddish-brown emergent, with thicker spines and slightly more concave leaves. Both, however, grow to a green or greenish-yellow color as they mature.

The cones also take different forms depending on the sex. Male cones are generally cylindrical and greenish-yellow while female cones are larger, more oval-shaped, and exhibit a greenish-brown color. They are dispersed by animals which feed on them, though many tend to damage it, resulting in non-viable seeds and further contributing to the species' extinction.

It was described in 1990 by Aldo Moretti, D.W. Stevenson and Paolo Deluca, honoring Jean Pierre Sclavo, a French collector of cycads, who first discovered this species.

== Uses ==
Although it has limited use in native Tanzanian society, it has gained popularity among other peoples, partly due to its status as an endangered species.
