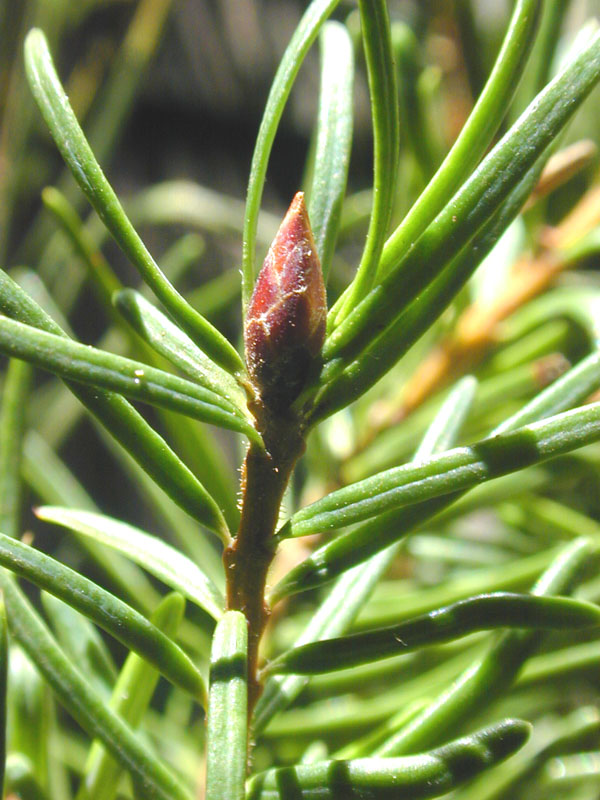

Scientific classification
- Kingdom: Plantae
- Class: Equisetopsida
- Subclass: Pinidae Cronquist, Takht. & Zimmerm. 1966

Orders and families
- Pinales; Pinaceae; Araucariales; Araucariaceae; Podocarpaceae; Cupressales; Sciadopityaceae; Cupressaceae; Taxaceae

= Pinidae =

Subclass of plants

Pinidae is a subclass of Equisetopsida in the sense used by Mark W. Chase and James L. Reveal in their 2009 article "A phylogenetic classification of the land plants to accompany APG III." This subclass comprises the conifers. The Pinidae subclass is equivalent to the division Pinophyta and class Pinopsida of previous treatments. There are over 600 species of Pinidae all over the world.

== Phylogeny ==
The following diagram shows a likely phylogenic relationship between subclass Pinidae and the other Equisetopsida subclasses.

- Equisetopsida
  - - - - - - - - Marchantiidae
  - - - - - - - - Bryidae
    - - - - - - - Anthocerotidae
      - - - - - - Lycopodiidae
        - - - - - Equisetidae
              - - Marattiidae
              - - Ophioglossidae
              - - Polypodiidae
          - - - - Cycadidae
                - Ginkgoidae
              - - Gnetidae
                - Pinidae
            - - - Magnoliidae
