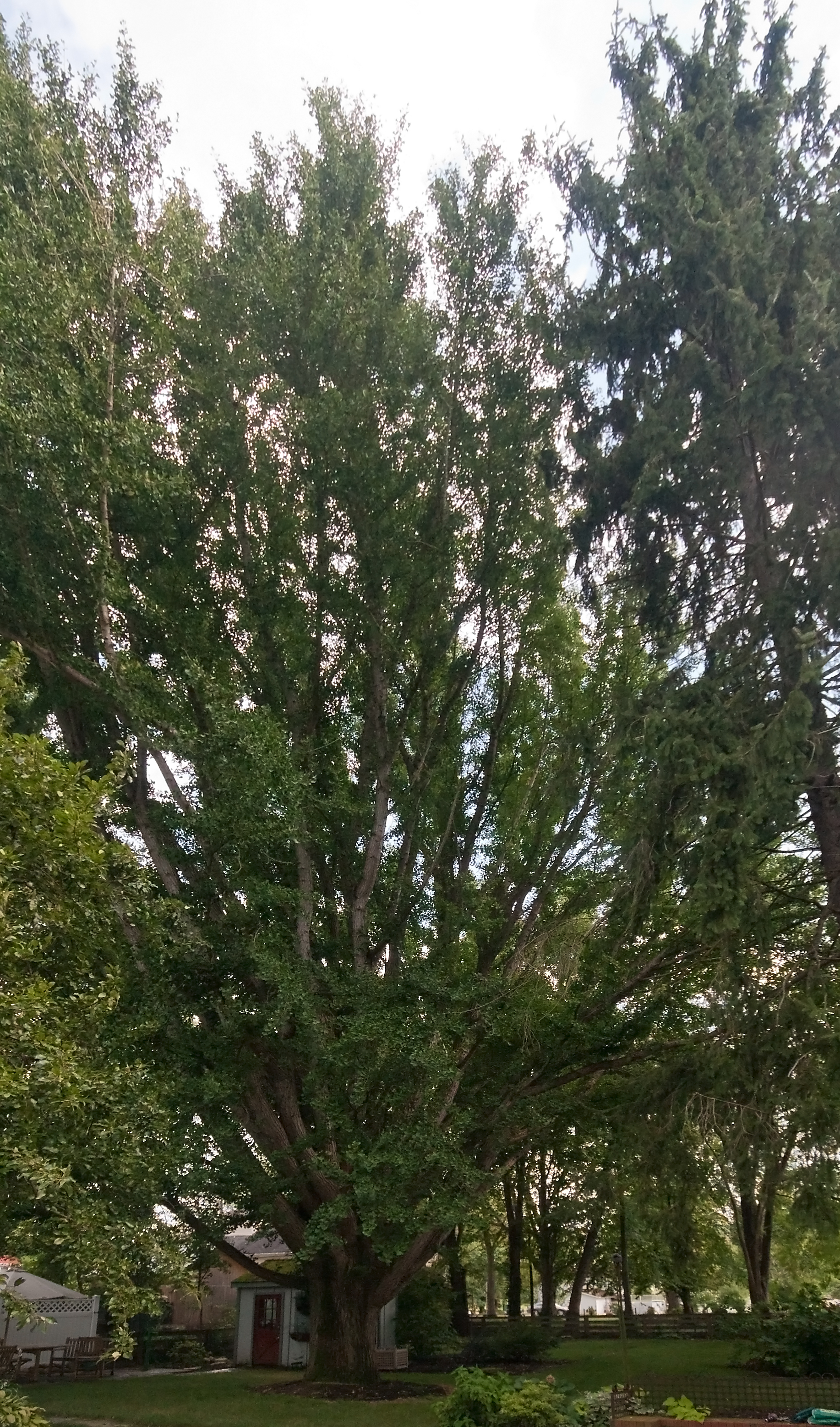

Scientific classification
- Kingdom: Plantae
- Class: Equisetopsida
- Subclass: Ginkgoidae Engl. in H.G.A.Engler & K.A.E.Prantl 1897

Orders
- Ginkgoales

= Ginkgoidae =

Ginkgoidae Temporal range: 199.6–0 Ma Jurassic to recent

Subclass of seed-bearing plants

Ginkgoidae is a subclass of Equisetopsida in the sense used by Mark W. Chase and James L. Reveal in their 2009 article "A phylogenetic classification of the land plants to accompany APG III." This subclass contains the single extant genus Ginkgo under order Ginkgoales, family Ginkgoaceae. Its only extant species is Ginkgo biloba, the maidenhair tree.

== Phylogeny ==
The following diagram shows a likely phylogenic relationship between subclass Ginkgoidae and the other Equisetopsida subclasses.

- Equisetopsida
  - - - - - - - - Marchantiidae
  - - - - - - - - Bryidae
    - - - - - - - Anthocerotidae
      - - - - - - Lycopodiidae
        - - - - - Equisetidae
              - - Marattiidae
              - - Ophioglossidae
              - - Polypodiidae
          - - - - Cycadidae
                - Ginkgoidae
              - - Gnetidae
                - Pinidae
            - - - Magnoliidae
