= Ivan Nikolaevich Gorozhankin =

19th century Russian botanist

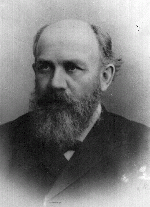
- Born: 28 August 1848; Voronezh
- Died: 20 November 1904 (aged 56); Moscow
- Resting place: Pyatnitskoye cemetery
- Education: Faculty of Physics and Mathematics of Imperial Moscow University
- Known for: Green algae, Gymnosperms
- Scientific career
- Fields: Botany, taxonomy
- Workplaces: Botanical Garden, Faculty of Biology, Imperial Moscow University
- Author abbrev. (botany): Gorozh.

Ivan Nikolaevich Gorozhankin (1848–1904) was a Russian botanist. His early education was in his home town of Voronezh, where he attended secondary school (1858–1865) before being admitted to the Law School at the Imperial Moscow University, before changing his enrollment to the natural sciences in 1871 and graduating with a thesis on Tropaeolaceae. After graduation, he continued working at the university, being appointed to the chair of botany in 1874. He founded the Moscow School of Botanical Morphology.

As Director of the Lomonosov Botanical Garden of the Faculty of Biology at Imperial Moscow University (1875–1902) he oversaw considerable expansion with new buildings and laboratories. Among his positions was vice president of the Moscow Society of Natural Sciences.

His herbarium collections are stored in the Herbarium of Moscow University.

== Bibliography ==
- "Горожанкин Иван Николаевич". Большая Советская Энциклопедия (Great Soviet Encyclopaedia) (in Russian).
- "Горожанкин Иван Николаевич - это... Что такое Горожанкин Иван Николаевич?". Словари и энциклопедии на Академике (in Russian). 2020.
