= M7GpppX diphosphatase =

Identifiers
- EC no.: 3.6.1.59

Databases
- IntEnz: IntEnz view
- BRENDA: BRENDA entry
- ExPASy: NiceZyme view
- KEGG: KEGG entry
- MetaCyc: metabolic pathway
- PRIAM: profile
- PDB structures: RCSB PDB PDBe PDBsum
Search
- PMC: articles
- PubMed: articles
- NCBI: proteins

M7GpppX diphosphatase (EC 3.6.1.59, DcpS, m7GpppX pyrophosphatase, m7GpppN m7GMP phosphohydrolase) is an enzyme with systematic name m^{7}G^{5}'ppp5'N m^{7}GMP phosphohydrolase. This enzyme catalyses the following chemical reaction

(1) m^{7}G^{5}'ppp5'N(3'ppp5'N)_{n} + H_{2}O $\rightleftharpoons$ 7-methylguanosine 5'-phosphate + pp5'N(3'ppp5'N)_{n}
(2) 7-methylguanosine 5'-diphosphate + H_{2}O $\rightleftharpoons$ 7-methylguanosine 5'-phosphate + phosphate

Decapping is a process in the control of eukaryotic mRNA degradation.
