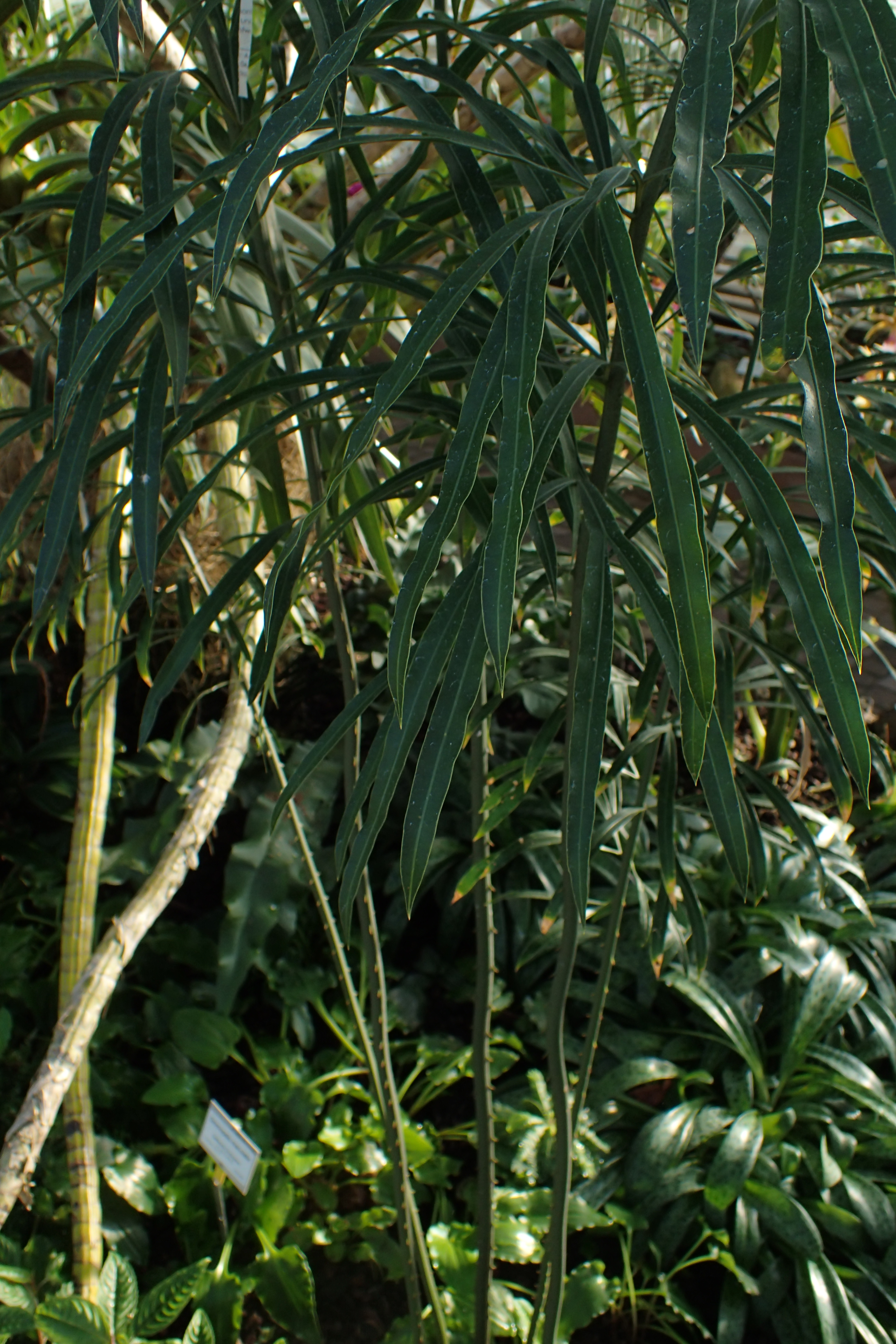

Conservation status
- Vulnerable (IUCN 3.1)

Scientific classification
- Kingdom: Plantae
- Clade: Tracheophytes
- Clade: Gymnospermae
- Division: Cycadophyta
- Class: Cycadopsida
- Order: Cycadales
- Family: Cycadaceae
- Genus: Cycas
- Species: C. micholitzii

Binomial name
- Cycas micholitzii Dyer

= Cycas micholitzii =

Species of cycad

Cycas micholitzii is a species of cycad in Vietnam and Laos.
