= Aljos Farjon =

Dutch botanist specialized in conifers

- Farjon on North Stradbroke Island Queensland June 2009.
- Born: March 5, 1946; Netherlands
- Education: University of Utrecht
- Scientific career
- Fields: Botany; Taxonomy
- Workplaces: Royal Botanic Gardens, Kew; University of Utrecht; University of Oxford

Aljos Farjon (born 5 March 1946) is a Dutch botanist and taxonomist known for his research on conifers and, subsequently, ancient oak trees and their associated biodiversity. He worked at the University of Utrecht, the University of Oxford, and the Royal Botanic Gardens, Kew, where he later became an Honorary Research Associate. He has published extensively on conifer taxonomy, systematics, distribution, ecology, and conservation, including the reference works A Handbook of the World's Conifers and An Atlas of the World's Conifers.

== Early life and education ==
Farjon was born on 5 March 1946 in the Netherlands. He attended high school in Hilversum and subsequently studied biology and botany at the University of Utrecht. His earliest botanical activities involved vegetation surveys for local and provincial nature conservation projects in the Netherlands. He subsequently undertook further botanical training and research at the University of Oxford. His professional career developed around plant taxonomy, with a particular specialization in conifers.

== Career ==
Farjon worked as a taxonomist at the University of Utrecht before moving to the University of Oxford. In 1993 he moved to the United Kingdom, where he continued his research at Oxford before joining the Royal Botanic Gardens, Kew in 1996. At Kew he worked primarily on the taxonomy and identification of conifers and was associated with the herbarium's temperate plant collections. He remained at Kew until his retirement and subsequently continued there as an Honorary Research Associate. Farjon has undertaken botanical fieldwork in numerous countries, particularly in regions containing diverse conifer floras. His research has involved the examination of herbarium specimens, field observations, taxonomy, geographical distribution, and conservation status.

Farjon is a Fellow of the Linnean Society of London. He has also been associated with the International Association for Plant Taxonomy, the Royal Horticultural Society's Conifer Registration Advisory Committee, and the International Dendrology Society.

== Conifer research ==
Farjon's principal area of research has been the taxonomy and systematics of conifers. His work has included studies of Pinus, Cupressaceae, and other conifer families and has contributed to the classification, identification, geographical documentation, and conservation assessment of conifer species.

Among his major publications is World Checklist and Bibliography of Conifers, first published in 1998 and subsequently revised. The second edition, published by Kew Publishing in 2001, provided a comprehensive listing of conifer names, synonymy, distribution, conservation status, and relevant literature.

Farjon co-authored the monograph Pinus (Pinaceae) with Brian T. Styles, published as part of the Flora Neotropica series in 1997. He subsequently published A Monograph of Cupressaceae and Sciadopitys in 2005. His other major works include A Natural History of Conifers and A Handbook of the World's Conifers.

A Handbook of the World's Conifers, originally published in 2010 and revised in 2017, provides taxonomic and ecological accounts of approximately 615 conifer species. The work covers the taxonomy, biology, ecology, geographical distribution, conservation, and uses of conifers and includes the Southern Hemisphere and tropical species as well as the better-known temperate taxa. The handbook was accompanied by An Atlas of the World's Conifers, co-authored with Denis Filer and published in 2013. The atlas provides distribution maps based principally on herbarium records. Farjon later summarized his research on the group in The Kew Review: Conifers of the World, published in Kew Bulletin in 2018.

== Conservation ==
Farjon has been involved in the conservation assessment of conifers through the International Union for Conservation of Nature (IUCN). He served as chair of the IUCN Conifer Specialist Group from 1995 to 2015. During this period, he was involved in global assessments of the conservation status of conifer species.

He also contributed to the development and maintenance of global databases documenting conifer taxonomy and distribution. His work on the Conifers of the World database has provided taxonomic and geographical information used in research and conservation.

=== Botanical illustration ===
Farjon has also produced botanical illustrations of conifers. His publications combine taxonomic descriptions with drawings and photographs documenting the morphology and appearance of species in their natural habitats. A Handbook of the World's Conifers as being illustrated with Farjon's line drawings and photographs from natural habitats.

=== Research on ancient oaks ===
Following his retirement from Kew, Farjon increasingly focused his research on ancient oak trees in England. His book Ancient Oaks in the English Landscape, first published in 2017, examines the history, ecology, distribution, and conservation of ancient native oaks in the English landscape. A second edition was published by Kew Publishing in 2022.

Farjon subsequently became involved in a biodiversity survey of High Park, Oxfordshire, an area of ancient woodland and wood pasture within the Blenheim Palace estate. The project investigated the biodiversity associated with ancient oak trees and other veteran trees. The International Oak Society reported on the completion of the survey in 2024 and its findings concerning ancient oaks as important centers of biodiversity. The results of the project were published in The Natural History of Blenheim's High Park in 2024, edited and co-authored by Farjon and published by Pelagic Publishing. The book documents the site's flora, fungi, lichens, invertebrates, and vertebrate fauna and examines the ecological importance of its veteran trees and wood pasture.

Farjon's later research has also examined natural regeneration of native oak and questions surrounding woodland restoration and rewilding in England. His book Rewilding Oak: Natural Regeneration of Oak and the Nature of the Wildwood was published by Kew Publishing in September 2026.

== Awards and recognition ==
Farjon received the Engler Medal in silver from the International Association for Plant Taxonomy for his work on Pinus published in Flora Neotropica.

In 2006, Farjon received the Veitch Memorial Medal from the Royal Horticultural Society. In 2015 Farjon received the IUCN Species Survival Commission Chair’s Citation of Exellence at the SSC plenary meeting in Abu Dhabi, UAE for his leadership in conifer species conservation.

His 2017 book Ancient Oaks in the English Landscape won the Garden Media Guild's Reference Book of the Year award in 2017.

== Selected publications ==
- Farjon, Aljos; Styles, Brian T. (1997). Pinus (Pinaceae). Flora Neotropica Monograph 75. New York Botanical Garden.
- Farjon, Aljos (2001). World Checklist and Bibliography of Conifers. 2nd ed. Royal Botanic Gardens, Kew.
- Farjon, Aljos (2005). A Monograph of Cupressaceae and Sciadopitys. Royal Botanic Gardens, Kew.
- Farjon, Aljos (2008). A Natural History of Conifers. Timber Press.
- Farjon, Aljos (2010). A Handbook of the World's Conifers. Brill.
- Farjon, Aljos; Filer, Denis (2013). An Atlas of the World's Conifers. Brill.
- Farjon, Aljos (2017). A Handbook of the World's Conifers. 2nd ed. Brill.
- Farjon, Aljos (2017). Ancient Oaks in the English Landscape. Kew Publishing.
- Farjon, Aljos (2018). "The Kew Review: Conifers of the World". Kew Bulletin. 73: 8.
