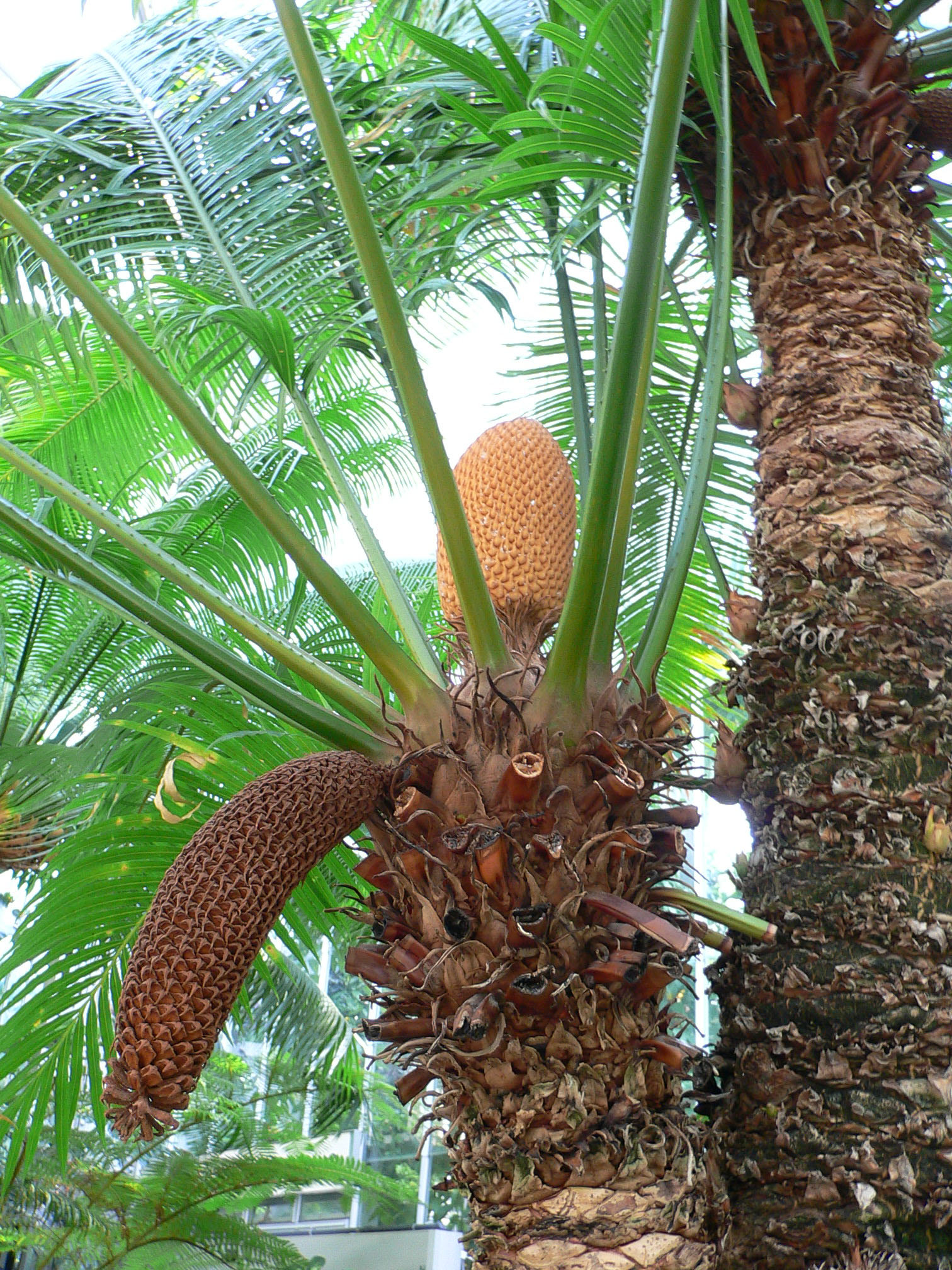
- Cycas rumphii with old and new male strobili

Scientific classification
- Kingdom: Plantae
- Clade: Tracheophytes
- Clade: Spermatophytes
- Clade: Gymnosperms
- Division: Cycadophyta; Bessey 1907: 321.
- Class: Cycadopsida; Brongn.
- Order: Cycadales; Pers. ex Bercht. & J. Presl

Extant groupings
- Cycadaceae; Zamiaceae

Synonyms
- Cycadofilicales Němejc 1950; Dioales Doweld 2001; Stangeriales Doweld 2001; Zamiales Burnett 1835

= Cycad =

Cycadales Temporal range: Early Permian–Holocene

Division of naked-seeded dioecious plants

Cycads /ˈsaɪkædz/—constituting the division Cycadophyta—are seed plants with a stout, woody cylindrical trunk with a crown of large, hard, stiff, evergreen and usually pinnate (feather-shaped) leaves. The species are dioecious, that is, individual plants of a species are either male or female. Cycads vary in size from having trunks only a few centimeters to several meters tall. They typically grow slowly and have long lifespans. They superficially resemble palms or ferns, but are not closely related to either group. Cycads are gymnosperms. Cycads have specialized pollinators, usually a specific beetle, and more rarely a thrips or a moth.

Both male and female cycads bear strobili, somewhat like conifer cones, containing their pollen and seeds, respectively. Cycads fix nitrogen in association with cyanobacteria living in their roots. Some species are used as narcotics, while in Vanuatu the plant symbolizes peace and appears on the national flag. Cycads all over the world are in decline, with four species on the brink of extinction and seven species each with fewer than 100 plants left in the wild.

== Description ==
Cycads are seed plants with a stout, woody, and usually unbranched cylindrical trunk, and a crown of large, hard, stiff, evergreen and (usually) pinnate leaves. The species are dioecious, that is, individual plants of a species are either male or female. Cycads vary in size from having trunks only a few centimeters to several meters tall. They typically grow slowly and have long lifespans. Because of their superficial resemblance to palms or ferns, they are sometimes mistaken for them, but they are not closely related to either group. Cycads are gymnosperms (naked-seeded), meaning their unfertilized seeds are open to the air to be directly fertilized by pollination, as contrasted with angiosperms, which have enclosed seeds with more complex fertilization arrangements. Cycads have very specialized pollinators, usually a specific beetle, and more rarely a thrips or a moth.

The leaves are pinnate (shaped like feathers), with a central leaf stalk from which parallel ribs emerge from each side of the stalk, perpendicular to it. The leaves are typically either compound, or have margins so deeply cut as to appear compound. The Australian genus Bowenia and some Asian species like Cycas multipinnata, C. micholitzii and C. debaoensis, have bipinnate leaves, the leaflets each having subleaflets. The apex of the stem is protected by modified leaves called cataphylls.

Cycads superficially resemble palms in foliage and plant structure, occur in similar climates, and are often mistaken for them. However, they are so distantly related that they are classified in different phyla. Their similarities are caused by convergent evolution. Differences between cycads and palms include the cones (strobili) of cycads: they are gymnosperms, whereas palms are flowering plants and bear fruit. Both groups' mature foliage look similar, but young emerging cycad leaves – before they unfold and shift into place in the rosette crown – resemble a fiddlehead fern; in contrast, new leaves of palms are just miniature versions of a mature frond. Another difference is in the stem: Both phyla show scarring on their stems – below the rosette, where leaves used to attach – but the scars on a cycad's trunks are helically arranged and small; the scars on palm trunks are a circle, that wraps around the whole stem. The stems of cycads are generally rougher and shorter than those of palms.

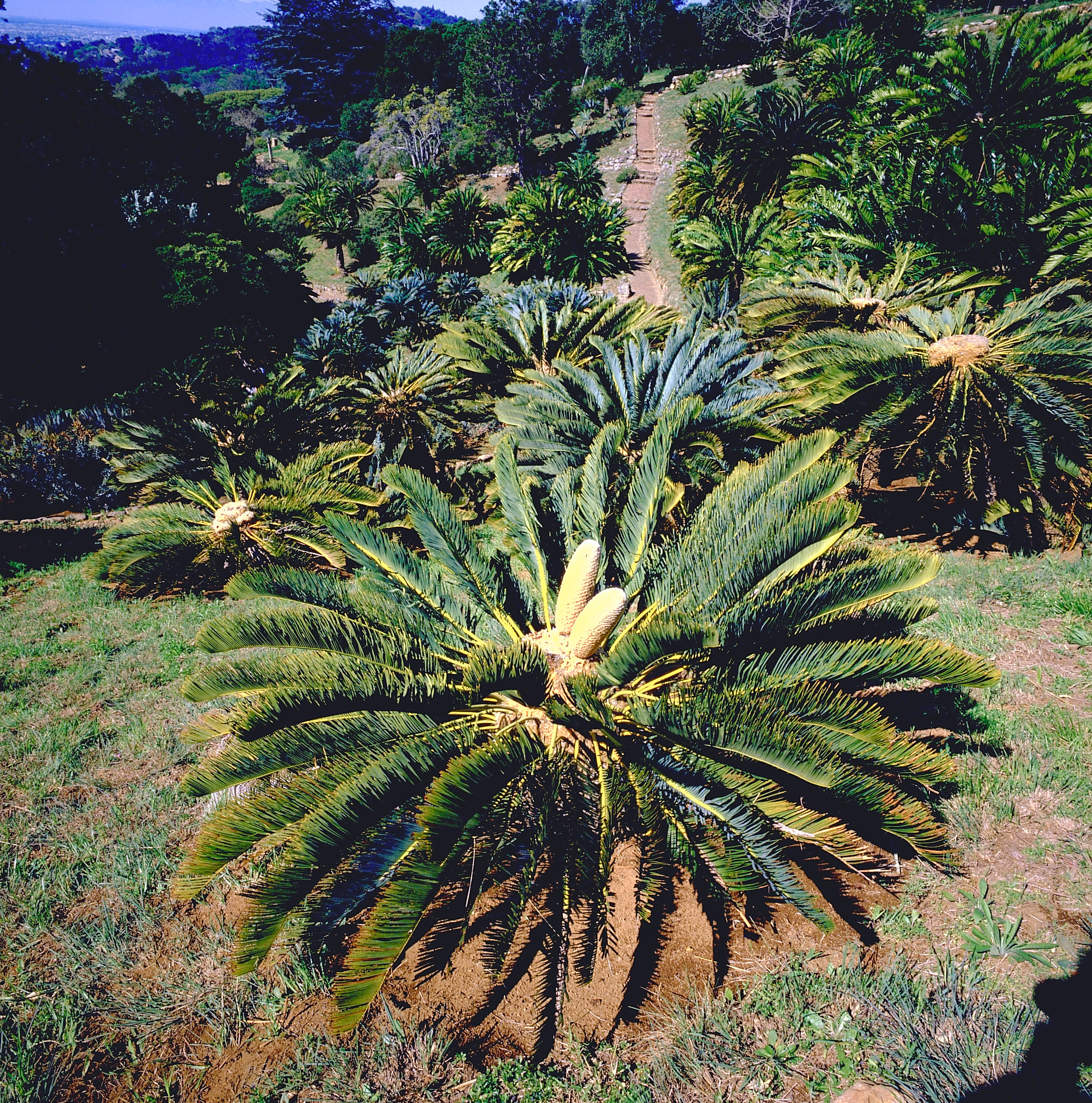
Growth habit

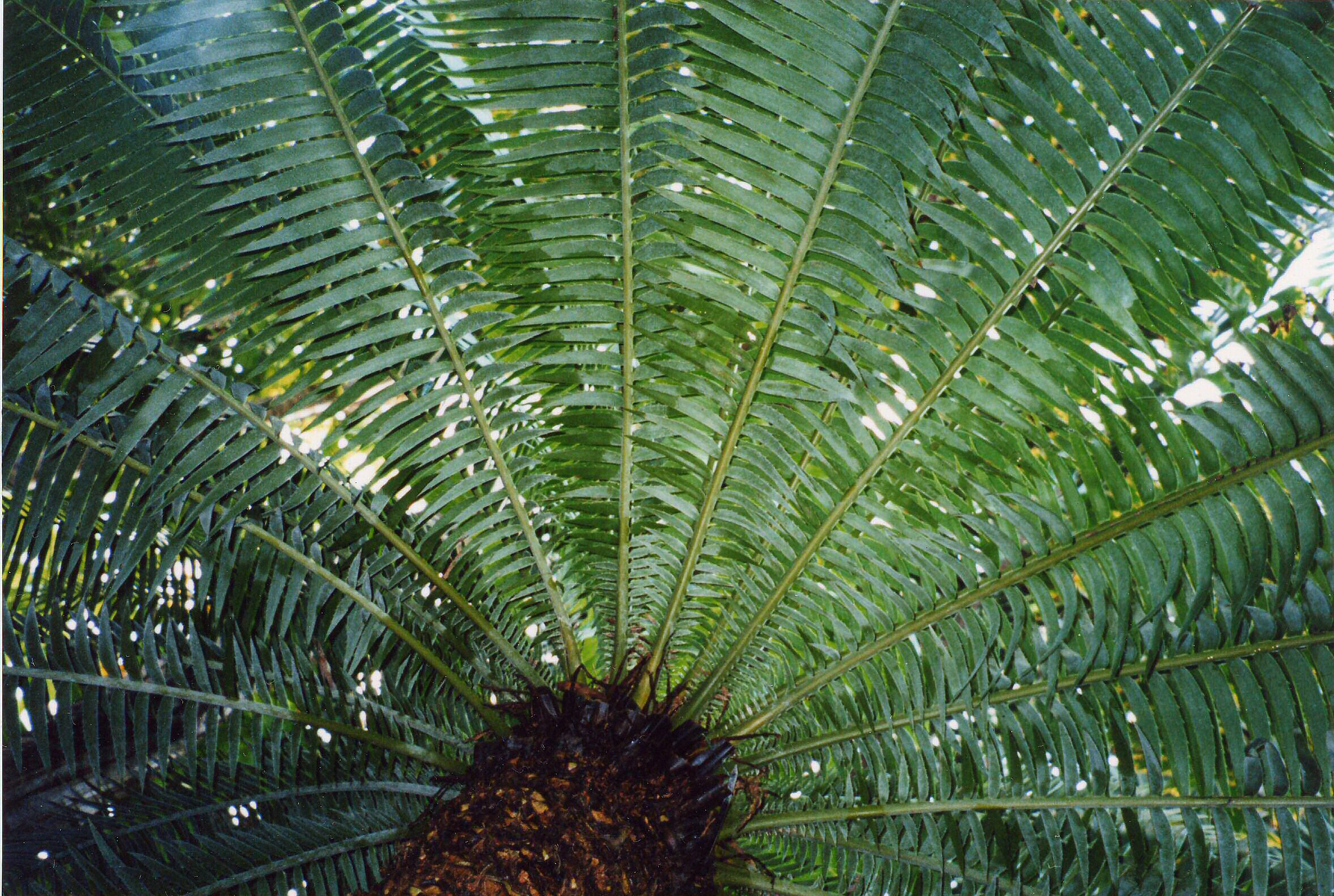
Rosette of pinnate leaves around a cylindrical trunk

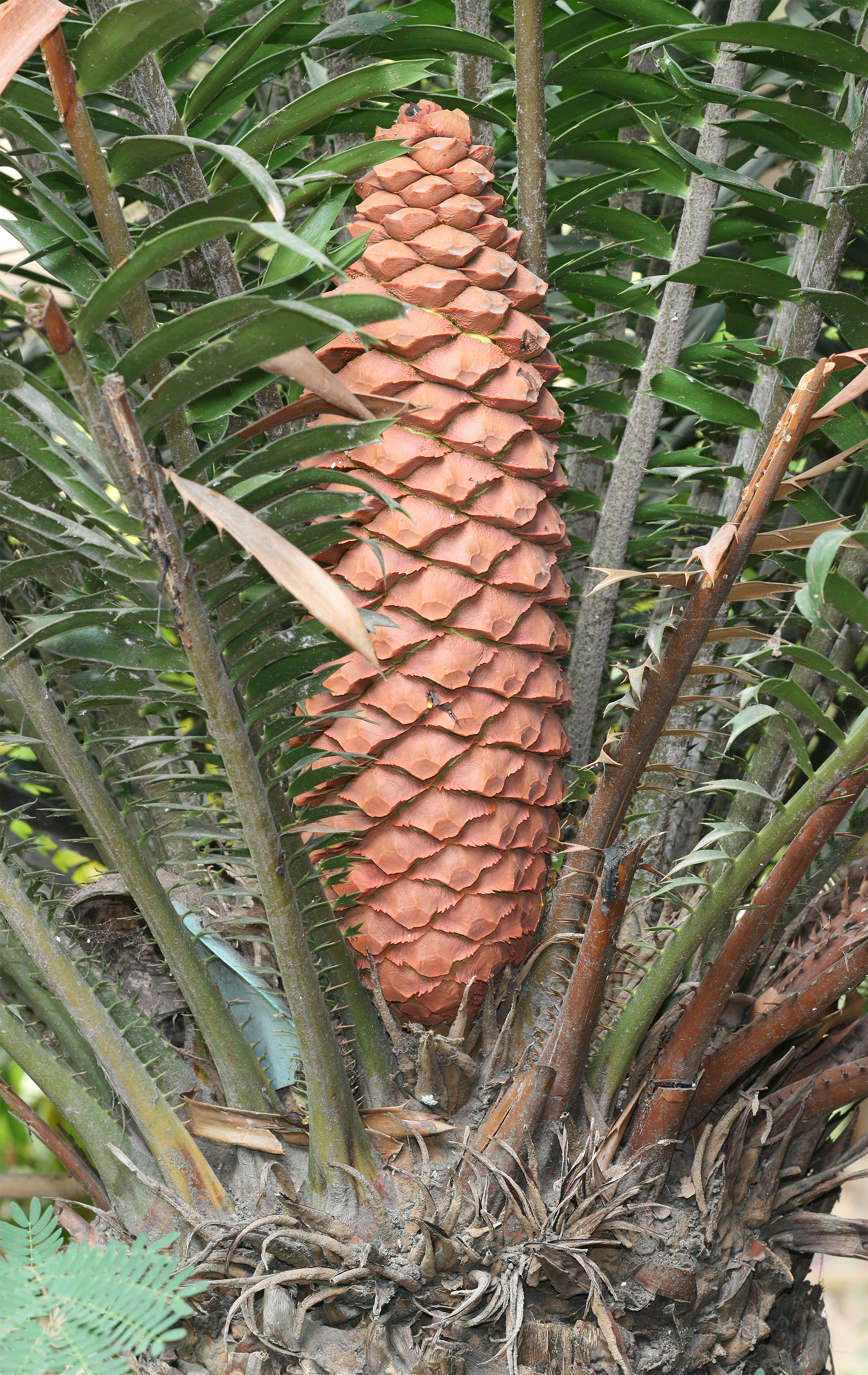
Leaves and strobilus of Encephalartos sclavoi

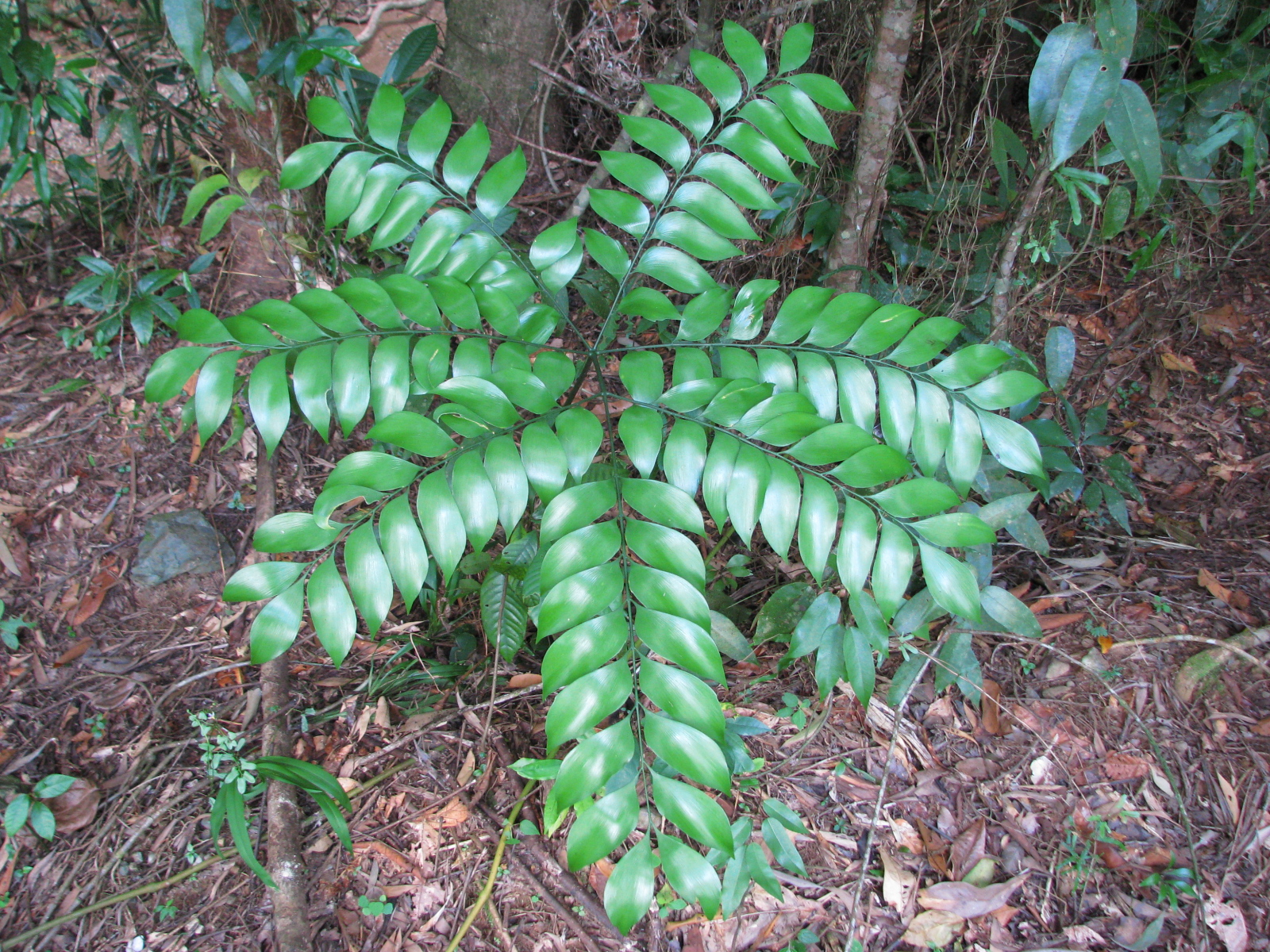
Bowenia spectabilis: plant with single leaf

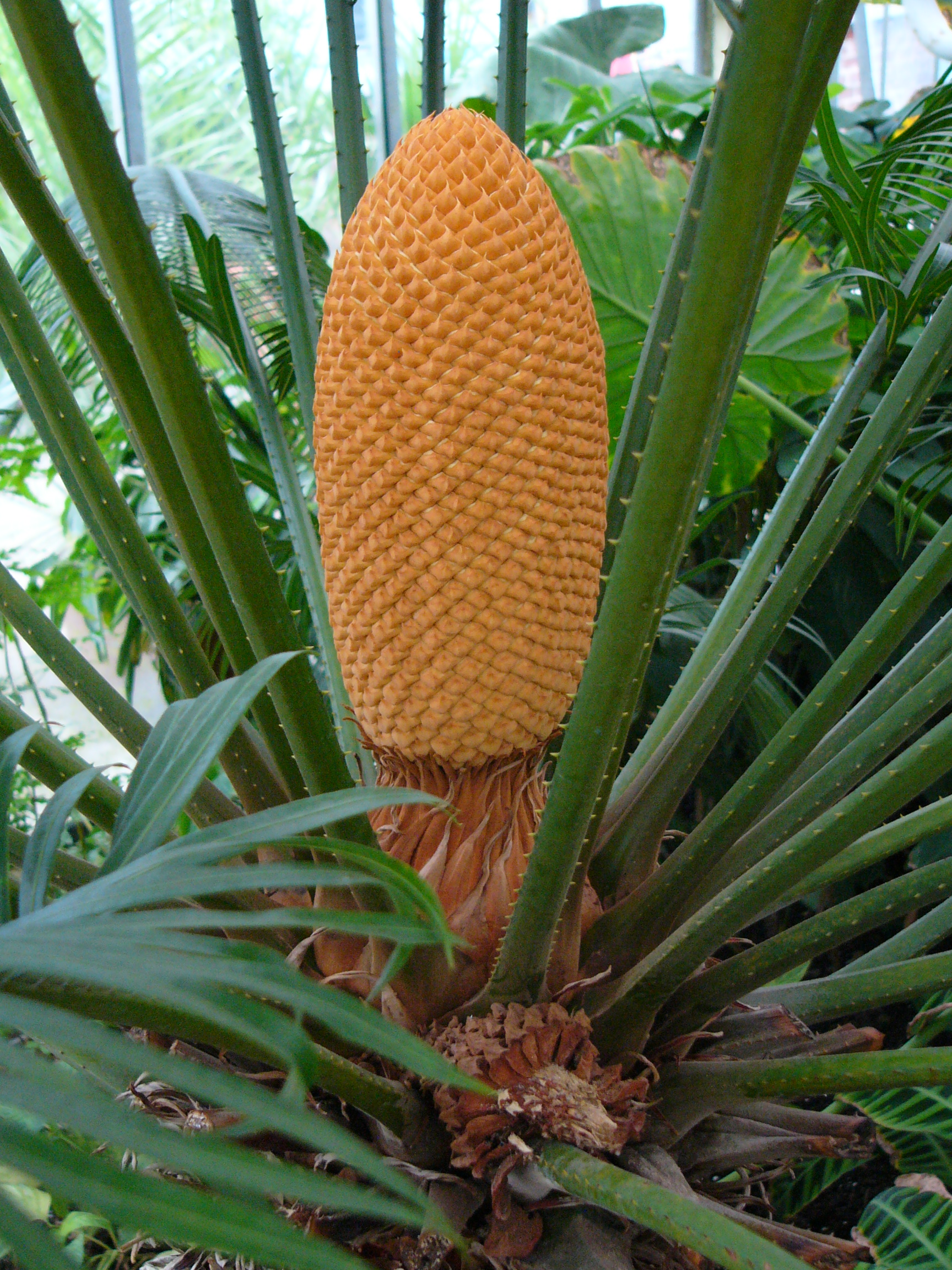
Cycas circinalis male cone

== Evolution ==
=== Fossil record ===
The oldest probable cycad foliage is known from the latest Carboniferous to early Permian (around 300 million years ago) of South Korea and China, such as Crossozamia. Unambiguous fossils are known from the early to middle Permian onwards. Cycads were uncommon during the Permian. The two living cycad families diverged from each other at some time between the Carboniferous and the Jurassic. Cycads are thought to have reached their apex of diversity during the Mesozoic. Although the Mesozoic is sometimes called "The Age of Cycads", some other groups of distantly related extinct seed plants with similar foliage, such as Bennettitales and Nilssoniales, were considerably more abundant than cycads during the Mesozoic: the "true" cycads were only minor components of Mesozoic vegetation. The oldest records of the modern genus Cycas are from the Paleogene of east Asia. Fossils assignable to Zamiaceae are known from the Cretaceous, with fossils assignable to living genera of the family from the Cenozoic.

=== Phylogeny ===
The two extant families of cycads both belong to the order Cycadales, and are the Cycadaceae and Zamiaceae (including Stangeriaceae). These cycads may have changed little since the Jurassic in comparison to some other plant divisions, but are by no means "living fossils" as they have continued to evolve. Based on genetic studies, cycads are thought to be more closely related to Ginkgo than to other living gymnosperms. They diverged from each other during the early Carboniferous.

==== External phylogeny ====
The Cycads have traditionally been thought to fall within the seed plants as the sister lineage to other groups. However, a more modern view is that they are Gymnosperms.

- Seed plants
  - Cycads
  - Ginkgo
  - - Conifers
    - Anthophytes
      - † Bennettitales
      - Gnetales
      - Angiosperms

Traditional view

- Seed plants
  - Gymnosperms
    - Cycads
    - Ginkgo
    - - Conifers
      - Gnetophytes
  - Angiosperms

Modern view

Cycadidae is a subclass of Equisetopsida in the sense used by Mark W. Chase and James L. Reveal in their 2009 article "A phylogenetic classification of the land plants to accompany APG III." This subclass comprises the cycads. The following diagram shows a likely phylogenic relationship between subclass Cycadidae and the other Equisetopsida subclasses.

- Equisetopsida
  - - - - - - - - Marchantiidae
  - - - - - - - - Bryidae
    - - - - - - - Anthocerotidae
      - - - - - - Lycopodiidae
        - - - - - Equisetidae
              - - Marattiidae
              - - Ophioglossidae
              - - Polypodiidae
          - - - - Cycadidae
                - Ginkgoidae
              - - Gnetidae
                - Pinidae
            - - - Magnoliidae

==== Internal phylogeny ====
The Cycads are in two clades, the Cycadaceae and the Zamiaceae.

- Cycads
  - Cycadineae
    - Cycadaceae
      Cycas
  - Zamiineae
    - Zamiaceae
      - Diooideae
        Dioon
      - Zamioideae
        - Encephalarteae
          - Macrozamia
          - - Lepidozamia
            - Encephalartos
        - Zamieae
          - Bowenia
          - - - Ceratozamia
              - Stangeria
            - - Zamia
              - Microcycas

=== Taxonomy ===
Classification of extant Cycadophyta to genus:

- Class Cycadopsida Brongniart 1843
  - Order Cycadales Persoon ex von Berchtold & Presl 1820
    - Suborder Cycadineae Stevenson 1992
      - Family Cycadaceae Persoon 1807
        - Genus Cycas
    - Suborder Zamiineae Stevenson 1992
      - Family Zamiaceae Horaninow 1834
        - subfamily Diooideae Pilg. 1926
          - Tribe Diooeae Schuster
            - Genus Dioon
        - subfamily Zamioideae Stevenson 1992
          - Tribe Encephalarteae Miquel 1861
            - Genus Macrozamia
            - Genus Lepidozamia
            - Genus Encephalartos
          - Tribe Zamieae Miquel 1861
            - Genus Bowenia
            - Genus Ceratozamia
            - Genus Stangeria
            - Genus Zamia
            - Genus Microcycas

== Distribution and ecology ==
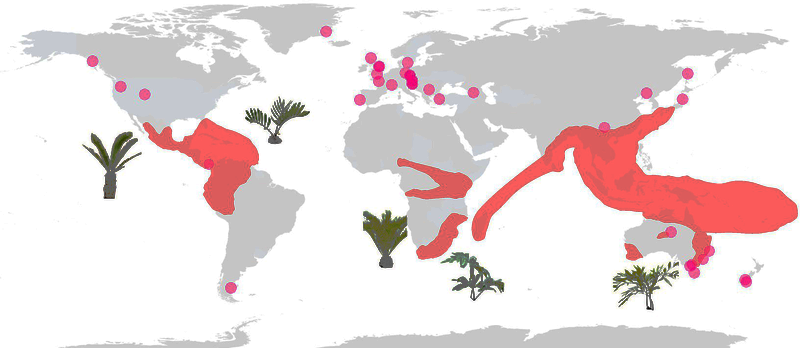
Global distribution of cycad genera. Red areas: cycad diversity; Purple dots: sampled fossil localities

The living cycads are found across much of the subtropical and tropical parts of the world, with a few in temperate regions such as in Australia. The greatest diversity is in the Americas, but they also grow in China, South and Southeast Asia, the Pacific islands, and southern and tropical Africa. Some are xerophytes that can survive in desert or semi-desert climates, others in wet rain forest conditions, and some in both.

Cycads accommodate nitrogen-fixing cyanobacteria in their coralloid roots. The cyanobacteria produce a neurotoxin, BMAA, that accumulates in the plants' seeds, possibly as a defense against herbivores.

Cycads have acquired a family of genes (fitD) from a microbe, most likely a fungus, via horizontal gene transfer, which gives them the ability to produce an insecticidal toxin.

== Relationship with humans ==
Nuts of Cycas orientis (nyathu) are eaten by the Yolngu in Australia's Arnhem Land. They are harvested during the dry season and soaked in water overnight before being ground into a paste, wrapped under bark, and cooked on an open fire. A pair of namele cycad leaves, representing peace, appears on the Flag of Vanuatu. Cycads are used as narcotics in Mexico, where they are among the substances called "peyote", while in South Africa, Encephalartos is used for the same purpose. In both regions, collecting for the drugs market is harming wild cycad populations. Cycads all over the world are in decline, with four species on the brink of extinction and seven species having fewer than 100 plants left in the wild. The Fossil Cycad National Monument was a protected area in South Dakota from 1922, containing many fossils of Cycadeoidea. After vandalism of the exposed fossils, the status was withdrawn in 1957.

Cycas micronesica seeds, containing β-Methylamino-L-alanine, were made into flour by the Chamorro people of Guam as a dietary staple. Chronic dietary exposure to BMAA is now considered to be a cause of the amyotrophic lateral sclerosis/parkinsonism–dementia complex (ALS/PDC) that had an extremely high rate of incidence among the Chamorro. The Chamorro call the condition lytico-bodig. In the 1950s, ALS/PDC prevalence ratios and death rates for Chamorro residents of Guam and Rota were 50–100 times that of developed countries, including the United States. No demonstrable heritable or viral factors were found for the disease, and a subsequent decline of ALS/PDC after 1963 on Guam led to the search for responsible environmental agents. Cycads harbor symbiotic cyanobacteria of the genus Nostoc in specialized roots which push up through the leaf litter into the light; these cyanobacteria produce BMAA. In addition to eating traditional food items from cycad flour directly, BMAA may be ingested by humans through biomagnification. Flying foxes, a Chamorro delicacy, forage on the fleshy seed covering of cycad seeds and concentrate the toxin in their bodies. Twenty-four specimens of flying foxes from museum collections were tested for BMAA, which was found in large concentrations in the flying foxes from Guam. As of 2021 studies continued examining BMAA biomagnification in marine and estuarine systems and its possible impact on human health outside of Guam.
