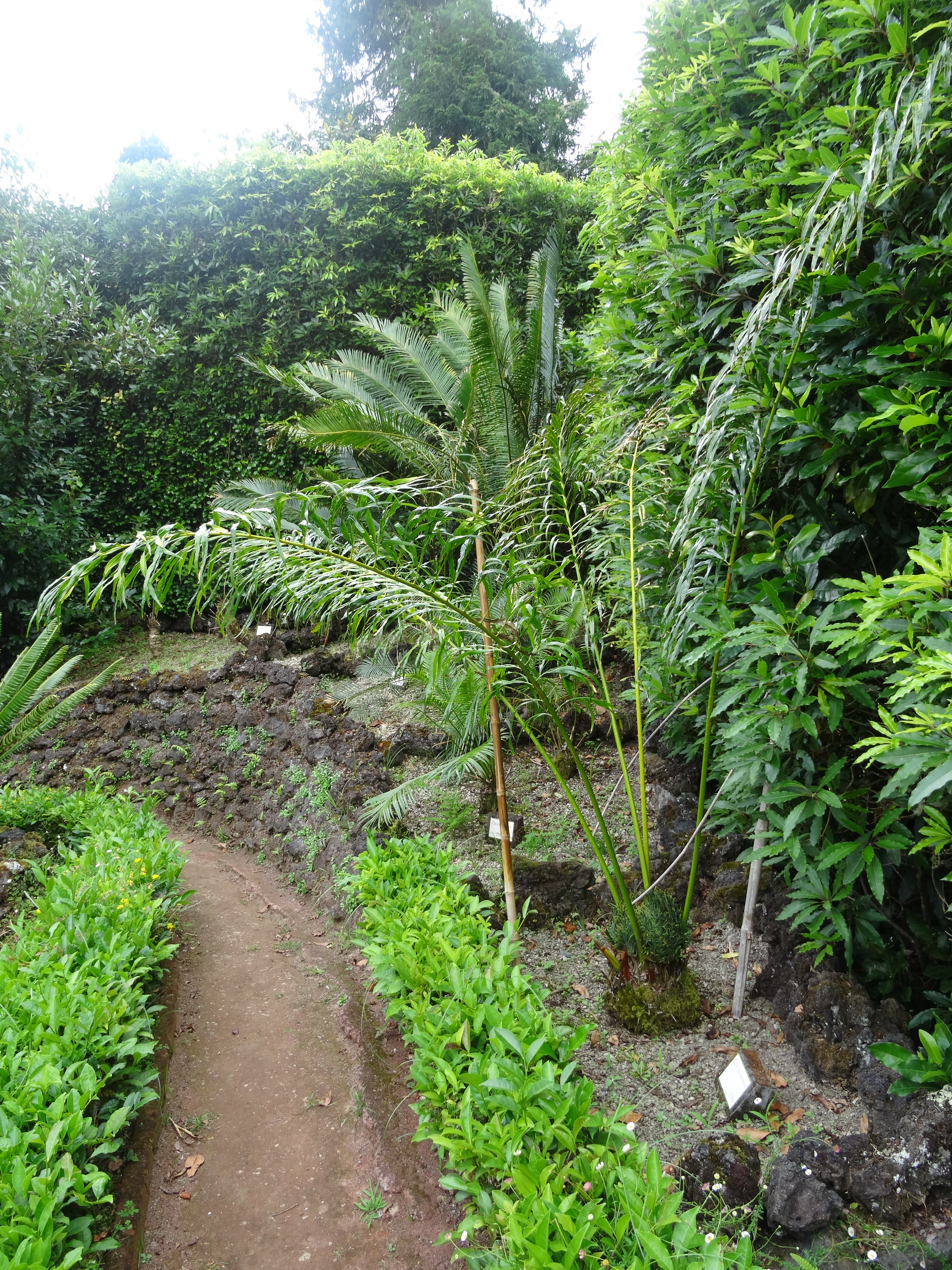

Conservation status
- Critically Endangered (IUCN 3.1)

Scientific classification
- Kingdom: Plantae
- Clade: Embryophytes
- Clade: Tracheophytes
- Clade: Spermatophytes
- Clade: Gymnosperms
- Division: Cycadophyta
- Class: Cycadopsida
- Order: Cycadales
- Family: Cycadaceae
- Genus: Cycas
- Species: C. multipinnata

Binomial name
- Cycas multipinnata C.J.Chen & S.Y.Yang

= Cycas multipinnata =

Species of cycad

Cycas multipinnata (or Epicycas multipinnata), common name Royal Sago, is a species of cycad of the Sago Palm Family (Cycadaceae) in southwestern China and northern Vietnam. It is one of the tuberous species which some taxonomists segregate as the genus Epicycas, and has the longest leaf stalks (petioles) of any Gymnosperm; up to 3.4 metres (11 ft). Cultivated plants have had petioles as long as 4 m (13 ft). The total length of the bipinnate frond can be up to 7 m (23 ft). Uniquely, the ultimate pinnules are Y-shaped. This very conspicuous plant somehow escaped notice until 1994. Among Gymnosperms, these fronds are exceeded in weight only by Encephalartos laurentianus, and the blade (lamina) of C. multipinnata is by far the largest.

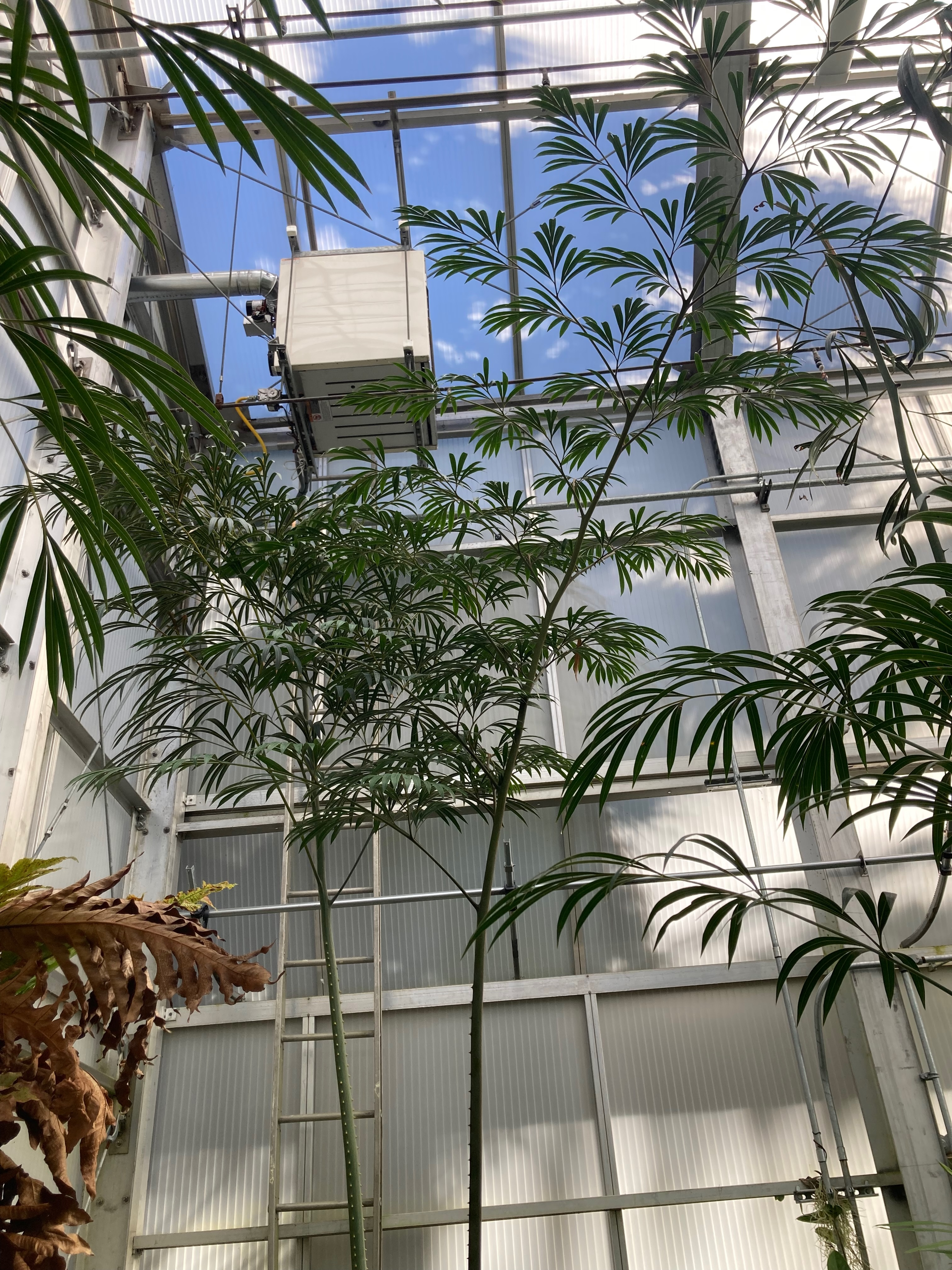
Leaf Frond.

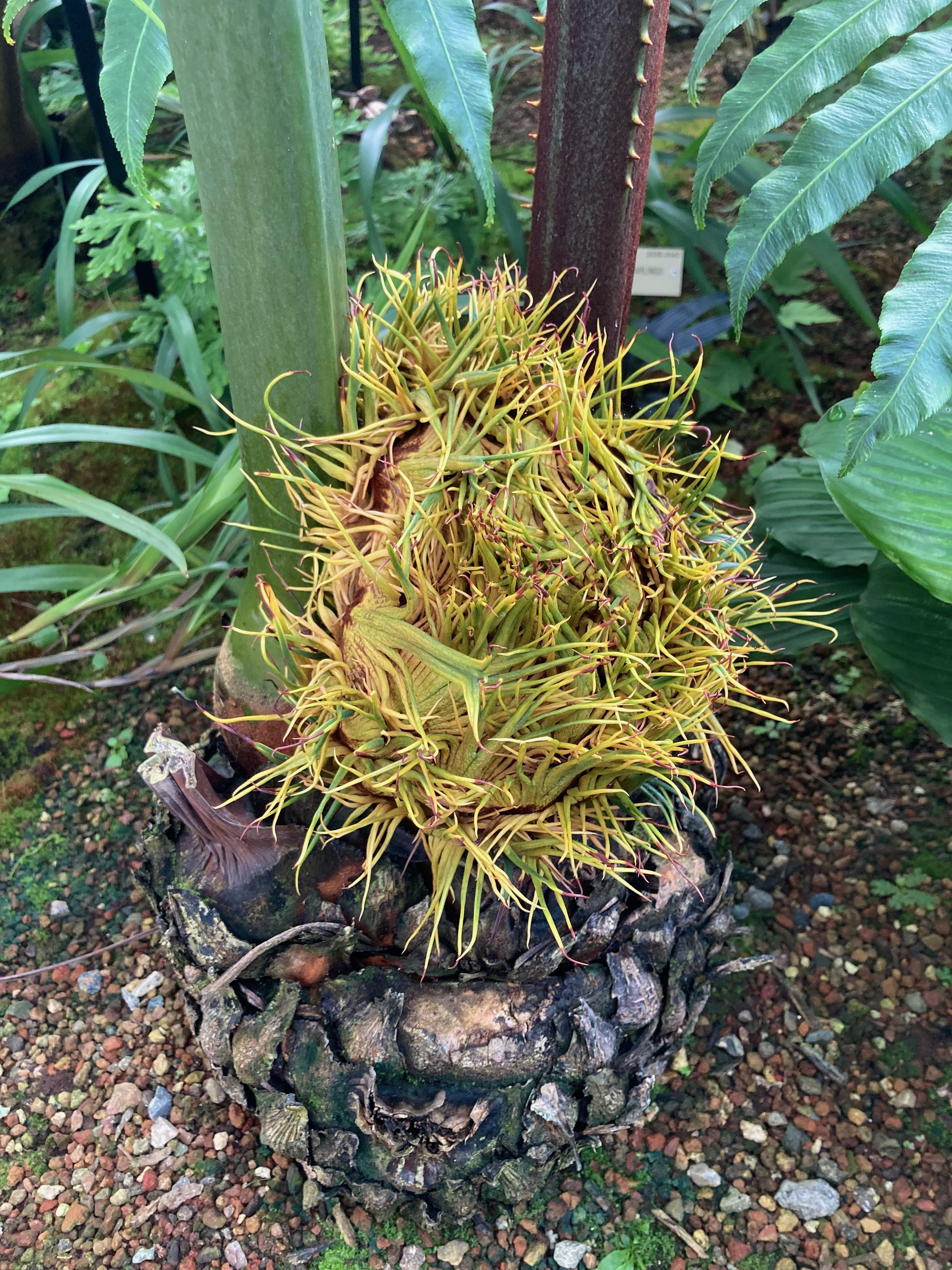
Cycas multipinnata at University of California Botanical Garden.

== Distribution ==
Cycas multipinnata is found in:

- Red River gorge in eastern Yunnan
- Honghe Nature Cycad Reserve, Yunnan
- Xilong Mountain Natural Reserve, Yunnan
- western Guangxi, China
- Yen Bai Province, northern Vietnam

It likely occurs in Honghe, Jianshui, Mengla, and Mile counties of Yunnan.
