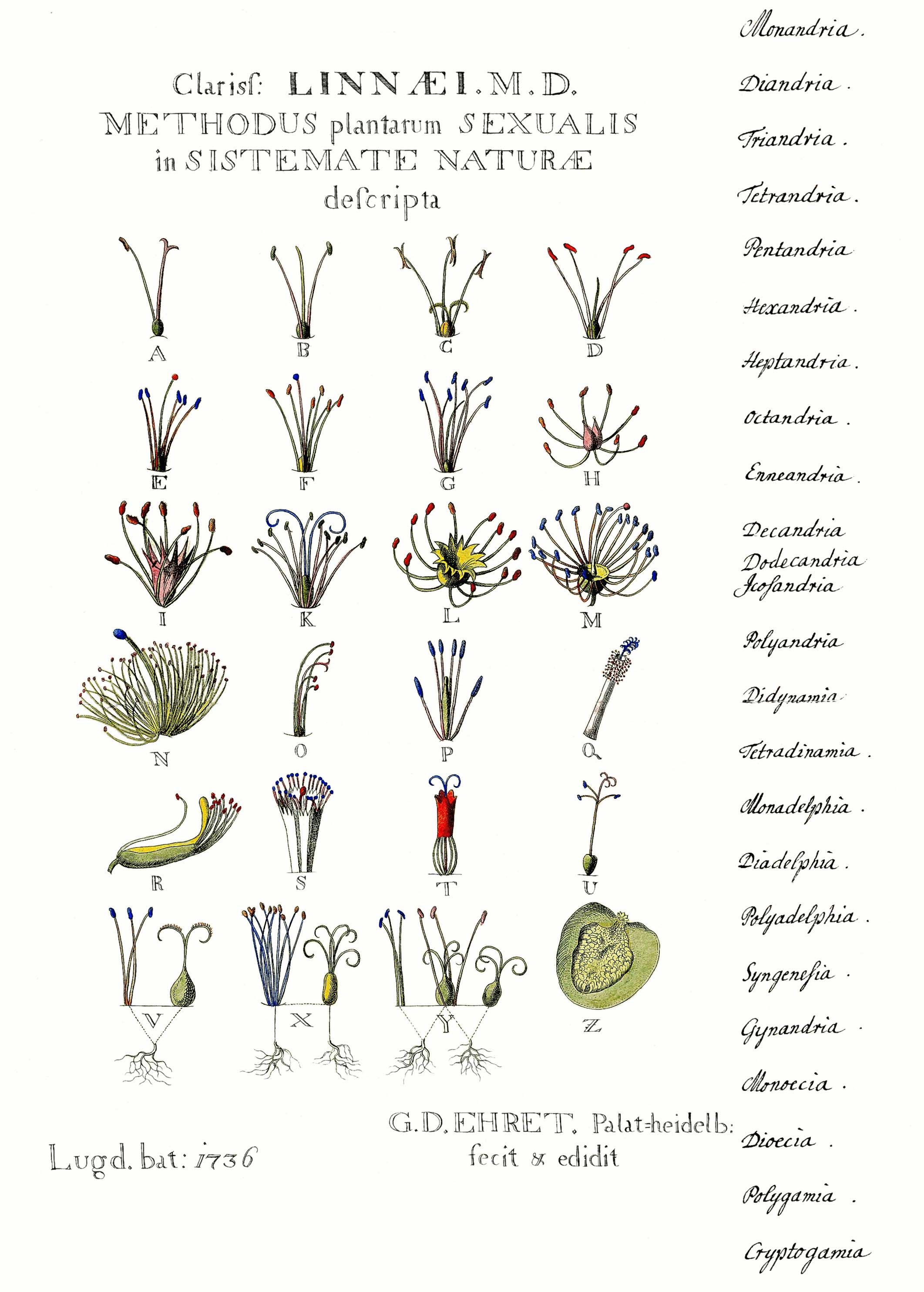

Scientific classification
- Kingdom: Plantae
- Class: Equisetopsida
- Subclass: Magnoliidae Novák ex Takht. (1967)

Superorders
- 18 superorders

Synonyms
- Angiosperms

= Magnoliidae sensu Chase & Reveal =

Magnoliidae

Subclass of plants

Magnoliidae is a subclass of Equisetopsida in the sense used by Mark W. Chase and James L. Reveal in their 2009 article "A phylogenetic classification of the land plants to accompany APG III." This subclass comprises the angiosperms or flowering plants.

== Phylogeny ==
The following diagram shows a likely phylogenic relationship between subclass Magnoliidae and the other Equisetopsida subclasses.

- Equisetopsida
  - - - - - - - - Marchantiidae
  - - - - - - - - Bryidae
    - - - - - - - Anthocerotidae
      - - - - - - Lycopodiidae
        - - - - - Equisetidae
              - - Marattiidae
              - - Ophioglossidae
              - - Polypodiidae
          - - - - Cycadidae
                - Ginkgoidae
              - - Gnetidae
                - Pinidae
            - - - Magnoliidae

== Superorders ==
Reveal and Chase, 2011, divide the Magnoliidae subclass into the following superorders:

- Amborellanae M.W.Chase & Reveal (2009)
- Nymphaeanae Thorne ex Reveal (1992)
- Austrobaileyanae M.W.Chase & Reveal (2009)
- Magnolianae Takht. (1967)
- Lilianae Takht. (1967)
- Ceratophyllanae Takht. ex Reveal & Doweld (1999)
- Ranunculanae Takht. ex Reveal (1992)
- Proteanae Takht. (1967)
- Trochodendranae Takht. ex Reveal (1996)
- Buxanae Takht. ex Reveal & Doweld (1999)
- Myrothamnanae Takht. (1997)
- Dillenianae Takht. ex Doweld (2001)
- Saxifraganae Reveal (1994)
- Rosanae Takht. (1967)
- Berberidopsidanae Thorne & Reveal (2007)
- Santalanae Thorne ex Reveal (1992)
- Caryophyllanae Takht. (1967)
- Asteranae Takht. (1967)

The following diagram shows a likely phylogenic relationship between the Magnoliidae superorders.

- Magnoliidae
  - - - - - - - - - - - - - - Amborellanae
  - - - - - - - - - - - - - - Nymphaeanae
    - - - - - - - - - - - - - Austrobaileyanae
      - - - - - - - - - - - - Magnolianae
        - - - - - - - - - - - Lilianae
          - - - - - - - - - - Ceratophyllanae
            - - - - - - - - - Ranunculanae
              - - - - - - - - Proteanae
                - - - - - - - Trochodendranae
                  - - - - - - Buxanae
                  - - - - - - Myrothamnanae
                    - - - - - Dillenianae
                      - - - - Saxifraganae
                          - - Rosanae
                      - - - - Berberidopsidanae
                        - - - Santalanae
                          - - Caryophyllanae
                            - Asteranae

== Orders ==
The Magnoliidae subclass contains the following orders, listed by superorder:

| Original 2009 paper | 2012 paper & 2013 updates |
|---|---|
| Amborellanae; Amborellales | Amborellanae; Amborellales Melikyan, A.V.Bobrov & Zaytzeva (1999) |
| Nymphaeanae; Nymphaeales | Nymphaeanae; Nymphaeales Salisb. ex Bercht. & J.Presl (1820) |
| Austrobaileyanae; Austrobaileyales | Austrobaileyanae; Austrobaileyales Takht. ex Reveal 1992; Chloranthales Mart. (1835) |
| Magnolianae; Canellales; Piperales; Magnoliales; Laurales; Chloranthales | Magnolianae; Magnoliales Juss. ex Bercht. & J.Presl (1820); Laurales Juss. ex Bercht. & J.Presl (1820); Canellales Cronquist (1957); Piperales Bercht. & J.Presl (1820) |
| Lilianae; Acorales; Alismatales; Petrosaviales; Dioscoreales; Pandanales; Liliales; Asparagales Link (1829); Arecales; Commelinales; Zingiberales Griseb. (1854); Dasypogonales; Poales | Lilianae; Acorales Mart. (1835); Arales Juss. ex Bercht. & J. Presl (1820); Tofieldiales Takht. (1995); Alismatales R.Br. ex Bercht. & J.Presl (1820); Potamogetonales Dumort (1839); Petrosaviales Takht. (1997); Narthecaiales Reveal & Zomlefer (1998); Dioscoreales Mart. (1835); Pandanales R.Br. ex Bercht. & J.Presl (1820); Liliales Perleb (1826); Orchidales Raf. (1815); Iridales Raf. (1815); Dasypogonales Doweld (2001); Arecales Bromhead (1840); Typhales Juss. ex Bercht. & J.Presl (1820); Bromeliales Link (1829); Rapateales Colella ex Reveal & Doweld (1999); Xyridales Lindl. (1846); Juncales Bercht. & J. Presl (1820); Restionales R.Br. ex Bercht. & J.Presl (1820); Poales Small (1903); Commelinales Mirb. ex Bercht. & J.Presl (1820); Cannales R.Br. ex Bercht. & J.Presl (1820) |
| Ceratophyllanae; Ceratophyllales | Ceratophyllanae; Ceratophyllales Link (1829) |
| Ranunculanae; Ranunculales | Ranunculanae; Eupteleales Hu ex Reveal (1993); Ranunculales Juss. ex Bercht. & J.Presl (1820) |
| Proteanae; Sabiales; Proteales; Trochodendranae; Trochodendrales | Proteanae; Sabiales Takht. (1997); Proteales Juss. ex Bercht. & J.Presl (1820); Trochodendrales Takht. ex Cronquist (1981) |
| Buxanae; Buxales | Buxanae; Buxales Takht. ex Reveal (1996) |
| Myrothamnanae; Gunnerales | Myrothamnanae; Gunnerales Takht. ex Reveal (1992) |
| Dillenianae; Dilleniales | Dillenianae; Dilleniales DC. ex Bercht. & J.Presl (1820) |
| Saxifraganae; Saxifragales; Cynomoriales | Saxifraganae; Peridiscales Raf. (1815, nom. cons.); Hamemelidales Thorne & Reveal (2007); Saxifragales Bercht. & J.Presl (1820); Cynomoriales Burnett (1835) |
| Rosanae; Vitales; Zygophyllales; Fabales; Rosales; Fagales Engl. (1892); Cucurbitales; Celastrales; Oxalidales; Malpighiales; Geraniales; Myrtales; Crossosomatales; Picramniales; Sapindales; Huerteales; Malvales; Brassicales Bromhead (1838) | Rosanae; Vitales Juss. ex Bercht. & J.Presl (1820); Zygophyllales Link (1829); Fabales Bromhead (1838); Rosales Bercht. & J.Presl 1820; Rhamnales Link (1829); Urticales Juss. ex Bercht. & J.Presl (1820); Juglandales Bercht. & J.Presl (1820); Cucurbitales Juss. ex Bercht. & J.Presl (1820); Celastrales Link (1829); Oxalidales Bercht. & J.Presl (1820); Violales Vent. ex Bercht. & J.Presl (1820); Rhizophorales Pers. ex Bercht. & J.Presl (1820); Linales Bercht. & J.Presl (1820); Ochnales DC. ex Bercht. & J.Presl (1820); Hypercales Juss. ex Bercht. & J.Presl (1820); Malpighiales Juss. ex Bercht. & J.Presl (1820); Euphorbiales Juss. ex Bercht. & J.Presl (1820); Chrysobalanales Link (1829); Geraniales Juss. ex Bercht. & J.Presl (1820); Myrtaneae Takht (1967); Myrtales Juss. ex Bercht. & J.Presl (1820); Crossosomatales Takht. ex Reveal 1993; Picramniales Doweld (2001); Sapindales Juss. ex Bercht. & J.Presl (1820); Huerteales Doweld (2001); Malvales Juss. ex Bercht. & J.Presl (1820); Capparales Juss. ex Bercht. & J. Presl (1820) |
| Berberidopsidanae; Berberidopsidales | Berberidopsidanae; Berberidopsidales Doweld (2001) |
| Santalanae; Santalales | Santalanae; Santalales R.Br. ex Bercht. & J.Presl (1829); Balanophorales Dumort (1820) |
| Caryophyllanae; Caryophyllales | Caryophyllanae; Polygonales Juss. ex Bercht. & J.Presl (1820); Nepenthales Dumort (1829); Tamaricales Link (1829); Caryophyllales Juss. ex Bercht. & J.Presl (1820) |
| Asteranae; Cornales; Ericales; Oncothecales Doweld (2001); Metteniusales Takht. (1997); Icacinales; Garryales; Gentianales; Vahliales; Boraginales Juss. ex Bercht. & J.Presl (1820); Solanales; Lamiales; Aquifoliales; Asterales; Escalloniales; Bruniales; Paracryphiales; Dipsacales; Apiales | Cornanae Thorne ex Reveal (1996); Cornales Link (1829); Ericanae Takht. (1967); Ericales Bercht. & J.Presl (1820); Lamianae Takht. (1967); Garryales Mart. (1835); Icacinales Tiegh. (1900); Gentianales Juss. ex Bercht. & J.Presl (1820); Solanales Juss. ex Bercht. & J.Presl (1820); Vahliales Doweld (2001); Lamiales Bromhead (1838); Asteranae; Aquifoliales Senft (1856); Asterales Link (1829); Escalloniales Mart. (1835); Bruniales Dumort. (1829); Apiales Nakai (1930); Paracryphiales Takht. ex Reveal (1992); Dipsacales Juss. ex Bercht. & J.Presl (1820) |
