= Dahlem Centre of Plant Sciences =

Coordinates: 52°27′59″N 13°17′59″E

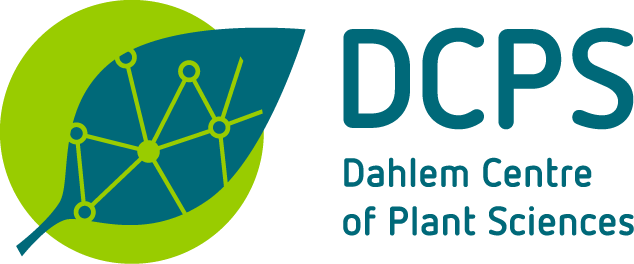
Logo

The Dahlem Centre of Plant Sciences (DCPS) is a department of the Free University of Berlin established in June 2009. The department supports the Botanical Garden Berlin-Dahlem, a large botanical garden and collection. Members of the DCPS are involved in teaching plant biology at different levels, including programs for the general public.

== Overview ==
The Dahlem Centre of Plant Sciences (DCPS) is a modern center for plant sciences at Freie Universität Berlin. As a Freie Universität Berlin research department, it is supported by funds from the university's future development strategy. Fields include a wide spectrum of plant sciences such as molecular and cell biology, genetics, biochemistry, plant physiology, developmental biology, systematics and taxonomy, phytogeography, ecology and pharmaceutical biology. The Berlin-Dahlem location was already the site of a plant science center in the early 1900s. Research aims is to investigate the evolution and function of plant diversity and to design strategies for a prospective sustainable use of natural plant resources. Themes arch from the investigation of diverse cellular processes to protection of the environment and crop improvement.

== Main research areas ==
DCPS projects focus on two major research areas: “Function and Diversity” and “Plant and Environment”. The research findings from both areas are transferred to practices supporting sustainable use and the protection of plant diversity. This involves the development of genetic resources (Applied Plant Sciences) to the management of varied ecosystems.

=== Function and Diversity ===
Function and Diversity research aims to produce new insights into the evolutionary development of the morphological and functional diversity of plants. The evolution of new traits and the mechanisms of genome evolutions are studied by combining comparative genomics with phylogenetic, biochemical and molecular techniques. The topics addressed include the evolution and function of signal transfer processes in plant cells, the role of the numerous plant secondary metabolites, the uptake and use of nutrients as well as the development of morphological features. This work is based on the rapidly growing information available from genome sequencing. These projects explore organisms beyond the model plant Arabidopsis to improve understanding of gene functions and the evolution of biological diversity.

=== Plant and Environment ===
In the Plant and Environment field of research, the focus is on plant functions and adaptive reactions in the context of constantly changing environmental conditions. The study concentrates on plant reactions to such abiotic stress factors as light intensity, extremes of temperature, lack of water and nutrients, as well as plant biotic interactions with other organisms, for example, insects or fungi. The research groups are working on the responses of plants to pathogens, plants’ cellular memory for environmental stress, the role of root architecture in fungi colonization and its significance for crop yields and the mechanisms of communication between neighboring plants.
