= New Caledonia rain forests =

Terrestrial ecoregion in New Caledonia

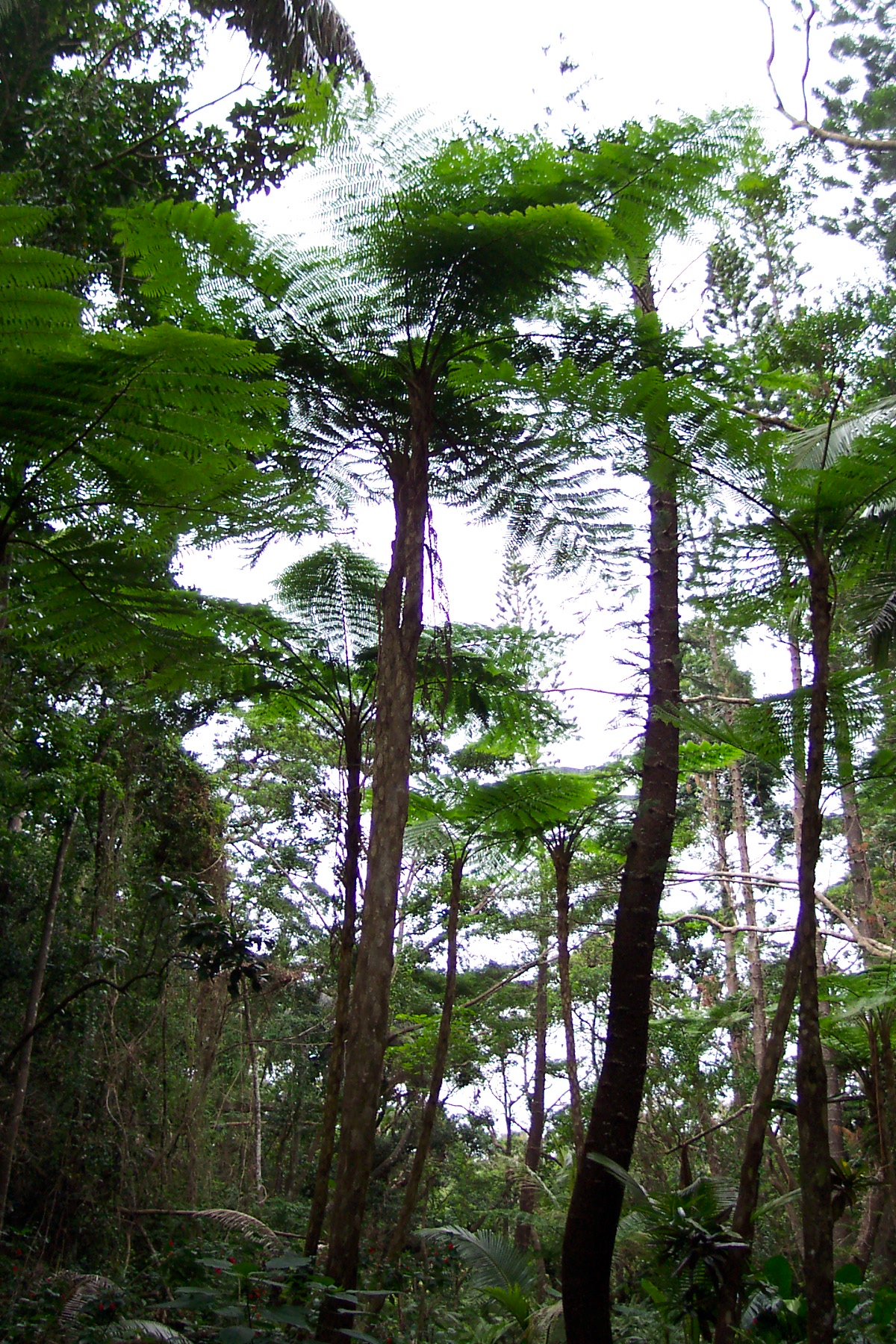
- Tree ferns on Isle of Pines

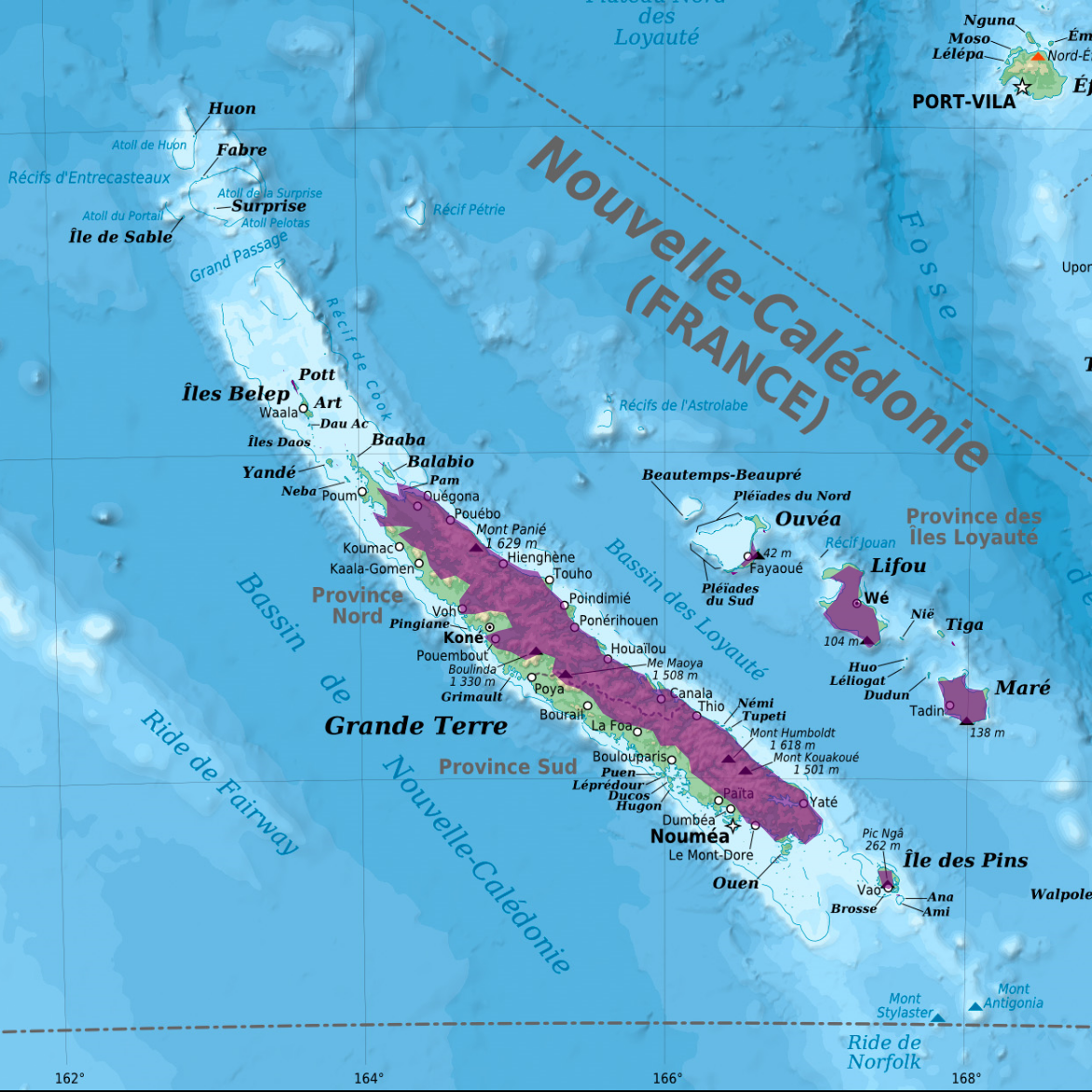
- Ecoregion territory (in purple)

Ecology
- Realm: Australasian realm
- Biome: tropical and subtropical moist broadleaf forests
- Borders: New Caledonia dry forests

Geography
- Area: 14,001 km^{2} (5,406 mi^{2})
- Countries: New Caledonia
- Coordinates: 21.49°S 165.65°E

Conservation
- Conservation status: Critical/endangered
- Protected: 7,872 km^{2}%

The New Caledonia rain forests are a terrestrial ecoregion, located in New Caledonia in the South Pacific. It is a tropical moist broadleaf forest ecoregion, part of the Australasian realm.

== Setting ==
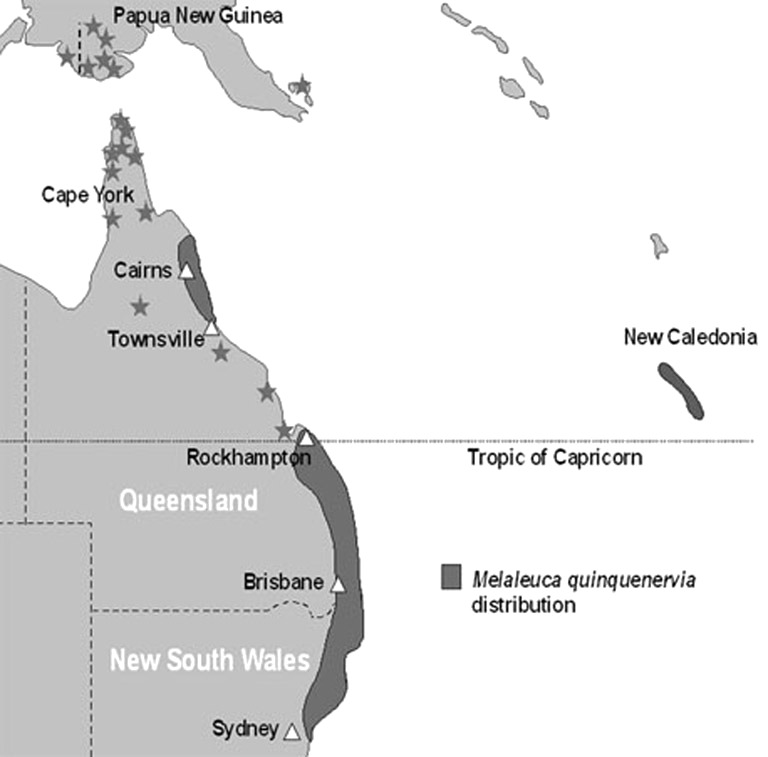
Original distribution area of Melaleuca quinquenervia or Niaouli

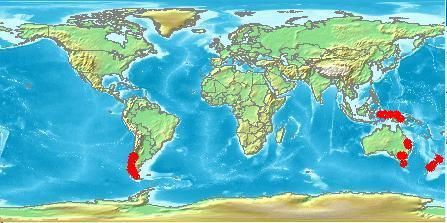
Nothofagus is a plant genus that illustrates Gondwanan distribution, having descended from the supercontinent and existing in current day Australia, New Zealand, New Caledonia and Chile. Fossils have also recently been found in Antarctica.

The ecoregion covers the windward eastern side of Grand Terre, New Caledonia's mountainous main island, as well as the smaller Loyalty Islands to the east and the Isle of Pines to the south of Grand Terre. The ecoregion covers an area of 14,600 square kilometers (5,600 sq mi).

Grand Terre is a long island that runs approximately north–south, with a mountain range down the center with five peaks that exceed 1500 meters elevation. The Loyalty Islands and Ile des Pins are much lower. New Caledonia lies astride the Tropic of Capricorn, between 19° and 23° south latitude, 1,200 km east of Australia and 1,500 km northeast of New Zealand.

The climate of the islands is tropical, and rainfall is highly seasonal, brought by trade winds that usually come from the east. Rainfall averages about 1,500 mm yearly on the Loyalty Islands, 2,000 mm at low elevations on eastern Grand Terre, and 2,000-4,000 mm at high elevations on Grand Terre. The western slopes of Grand Terre, which are in the rain shadow of the central mountain range, are much drier, and are home to the New Caledonia dry forests ecoregion.

New Caledonia is an ancient fragment of Gondwana, the southern supercontinent. It separated from Australia 85 million years ago, and remained attached to New Zealand until 55 million years ago. It has been isolated from other land masses since then, although a number of plants and animals have been able to cross the straits separating New Caledonia from neighboring islands.

The forests are made up of laurel-leaved evergreen hardwood trees, reaching up to 40 m in height. Many of the species are endemic to the islands, and harbour and rich biota of understorey plants, invertebrates, and birds and bats.

New Caledonia's fauna and flora derive from ancestral species isolated in the region when it broke away from Gondwana many tens of millions of years ago. Not only endemic species have evolved here, but entire genera and even families are unique to the islands.

More tropical Gymnosperm species are endemic to New Caledonia than to any similar region on Earth. Of the 44 indigenous species of gymnosperms, 43 are endemic, including the only known parasitic Gymnosperm (Parasitaxus usta). Again, of the 35 known species of Araucaria, 13 are endemic to New Caledonia.

The world's largest extant species of fern, Sphaeropteris intermedia, also is endemic to New Caledonia. It is very common on acid ground, and grows about one metre per year on the east coast, usually on fallow ground or in forest clearings. There also are other species of Cyathea, notably Sphaeropteris novae-caledoniae.

The islands soils derived largely from ultramafic rocks, and have been a refuge for many native flora species that have adapted to their composition a long time ago; such flora can survive on acid soils with unfavourable compositions of nutrient elements. On New Caledonia examples of such soils commonly have an excess of magnesium, plus unusually high concentrations of phytotoxic compounds of heavy metals such as nickel. Not many invader species can compete successfully with plants adapted to such challenging soils.

New Caledonia also is one of five regions on the planet where species of Nothofagus are indigenous; five species are known to occur here.

Cloud forest formerly covered much of the tropical mountain and coastal areas of the world. The laurel forests are found in the islands of the Oceans, some tropical mountains and locally on favourable wet climate microenvironments of the coast and coastal mountains of the mainland, but the forests have been much reduced in extent by logging, clearance for agriculture and grazing, and the invasion of exotic species. The decline of much of the endemic fauna and flora is largely due to deforestation to accommodate agricultural expansion. This is accompanied by displacement of native flora by invasive alien weeds and crop plants. The most famous laurisilva forests remain on Madeira, where they are found between 300 m and 1400 m altitude on the northern slope, and 700 m to 1600 m on the southern slope, and cover 149,5 km^{2}.

The laurifolia appears in mountains of the coastal strip of New South Wales in Australia, New Guinea, New Caledonia, Tasmania, and New Zealand. The laurel forests of Australia, Tasmania, and New Zealand are home to species related to those in South Africa, Macaronesia, Madagascar, South Japan, Jeju island in Korea, Taiwan, South China coast, North America coasts to Panama and the Valdivian laurel forests, including southern beech (Nothofagus) through the connection of the Antarctic flora. Other typical flora include Winteraceae, Myrtaceae, southern sassafras (Atherospermataceae), conifers of Araucariaceae, Podocarpaceae, and Cupressaceae, and tree ferns.

New Caledonia was an ancient fragment of the supercontinent Gondwana. Unlike many of the Pacific Islands, which are of relatively recent volcanic origin, New Caledonia is part of Zealandia, a fragment of the ancient Gondwana super-continent. Zealandia separated from Australia 60–85 million years ago, and the ridge linking New Caledonia to New Zealand has been deeply submerged for millions of years. This isolated New Caledonia from the rest of the world's landmasses, preserving a snapshot of Gondwanan forests. New Caledonia and New Zealand are separated by continental drift of Australia 85 million years ago. The islands still shelters an extraordinary diversity of endemic plants and animals of Gondwanan origin have spread to the southern continents later.

The laurel forest of Australia, New Caledonia (Adenodaphne), and New Zealand have a number of other related species of the Valdivian laurel forest, through the connection of the Antarctic flora of gymnosperms like the podocarpus and deciduous Nothofagus. New Caledonia lies at the northern end of the ancient continent Zealandia, while New Zealand rises at the plate boundary that bisects it. These land masses are two outposts of the Antarctic flora, including Araucarias and Podocarps. At Curio Bay, logs of a fossilized forest closely related to modern kauri and Norfolk pine can be seen that grew on Zealandia about 180 million years ago during the Jurassic period, before it split from Gondwana.

During glacial periods more of Zealandia becomes a terrestrial rather than a marine environment. Zealandia was originally thought to have no native land mammal fauna, but a recent discovery in 2006 of a fossil mammal jaw from the Miocene in the Otago region shows otherwise.

New Guinea and Northern Australia ecoregion are closely related. Over time Australia and New Caledonia drifted north. New Caledonia protected by the ocean remained unchanged preserving their species and Australia became drier; the humid Antarctic flora from Gondwana retreated to the east coast and Tasmania, while the rest of Australia became dominated by Acacia, Eucalyptus, and Casuarina, as well as xeric shrubs and grasses. Humans arrived in Australia 50–60,000 years ago, and used fire to reshape the vegetation of the continent; as a result, the Antarctic flora, also known as the rainforest flora in Australia, retreated to a few isolated areas composing less than 2% of Australia's land area.

== Flora ==
The New Caledonia rain forests are made up of three predominant forest types. The lowland rain forests cover the Loyalty Islands, and the Iles des Pines and the lower elevations of Grand Terre. Montane forests cover the higher elevations of Grand Terre. The wet maquis forests of Grand Terre are low shrub forests found on rocky soils derived from ultramafic rocks.

The predominant flora of New Caledonia rain forests is derived from the Antarctic flora of ancient southern Gondwana. Like the Australian rainforests and the temperate forests of New Zealand, conifers of the Southern Hemisphere families Araucariaceae and Podocarpaceae are mixed with angiosperm trees, including the Southern Hemisphere genus Nothofagus and trees and shrubs of families Myrtaceae and Proteaceae.

The lowland forests are a generally a mixed-species composition, interspersed with some single species stands. The predominant conifers are Araucaria columnaris, A. bernieri, Agathis lanceolata, A. ovata (Araucariaceae), and Dacrydium araucarioides, Dacrycarpus vieillardii and Falcatifolium taxoides (Podocarpaceae). Predominant angiosperm trees include Montrouziera cauliflora, Calophyllum caledonicum, Didymocheton spp., Neoguillauminia cleopatra, and Hernandia cordigera, together with species of the Proteaceae genera Kermadecia, Macadamia, and Sleumerodendron. Araucaria, Callistemon, and Nothofagus predominate in the single-species stands.

The Montane rain forests are also mixed-species, predominantly the conifers Araucaria, Agathis, Podocarpus, Dacrydium, Libocedrus, and Acmopyle, and the angiosperms Metrosideros, Pterophylla, Quintinia, and Nothofagus.

The Maquis forests hold a great variety of species, with many endemics. The ultramafic rocks, which formed in the deep ocean, are rich in metals, including nickel, magnesium, chromium, and manganese, which are toxic to many plants. The predominant trees are stunted Araucarias.

== Fauna ==
New Caledonia has one of the most enigmatic birds of the world, the endangered kagu. It is related to the cranes and it lives very hidden. It is also the heraldic bird of the island. Another endemic bird is the New Caledonian rail. This critically endangered bird could be extinct but many believe that it still persists. Both the New Caledonian owlet-nightjar and the New Caledonian lorikeet are believed to persist under similar circumstances. There are also another twenty or so endemic birds on the island, including the tool-using New Caledonian crow. See Endemic birds of New Caledonia for more details. The seashells from New Caledonia are in great demand by collectors.

== Conservation ==
A 2017 assessment found that 7,872 km^{2}, or 56%, of the ecoregion is in protected areas. Protected areas include Parc de la Côte Oubliée (1222.59 km^{2}), Blue River Provincial Park (220.72 km^{2}), Parc de la Haute Dumbéa (91.71 km^{2}), and Parc des Grandes Fougères (45.45 km^{2}). Parc de la Zone Côtière Ouest (2552.68 km^{2}) is partly in the New Caledonia dry forests ecoregion.

== See also ==
- Biodiversity of New Caledonia
