= Agathis atropurpurea =

- In highland rainforest west of Cairns, Queensland

Conservation status
- Least Concern (NCA)
- Near Threatened (IUCN 3.1)

Scientific classification
- Kingdom: Plantae
- Clade: Tracheophytes
- Clade: Gymnosperms
- Division: Pinophyta
- Class: Pinopsida
- Order: Araucariales
- Family: Araucariaceae
- Genus: Agathis
- Species: A. atropurpurea

Binomial name
- Agathis atropurpurea B.Hyland

Species of flowering plant

Agathis atropurpurea, commonly known as the blue kauri, and occasionally as the black kauri (Note: The common name "black kauri" is also one of the names that is applied to a closely related north Queensland endemic species, Agathis microstachya. For that reason this article uses "blue kauri" exclusively to avoid any potential misunderstandings) or purple kauri, is a species of conifer in the family Araucariaceae. The family was distributed almost worldwide during the Jurassic and Cretaceous periods, and is now mostly confined to the Southern Hemisphere. This species is endemic to a small part of northeastern Queensland, Australia.

== Description ==
Agathis atropurpurea is a large rainforest emergent tree growing up to 50 m (160 ft) in height and a diameter of up to 2 m (6 ft 7 in). The trunk is cylindrical and very straight, with smooth to flaky bark that is mottled with dark blue, purple, and almost black patches. In very large trees the bark is brown and it may then be confused with the bull kauri, Agathis microstachya, a species that is both genetically and geographically related. However, even large specimens of the blue kauri will usually have some dark patches that enable a positive identification.

The branches are more or less horizontal, and the leaf-bearing twigs are pendant. The leaves are opposite and distichous, held on very short petioles measuring 1–2 mm (0.04–0.08 in) long. They are lanceolate to elliptic with fine longitudinal veins, and measure up to 7 by 2 cm (2.8 by 0.8 in).

The male cones are cylindrical and measure up to 16 mm (0.6 in) long by 7 mm (0.3 in) wide, and are held on a peduncle about 2–3 mm (0.08–0.12 in) long. The mature female cones are green, globular, about 5 cm (2.0 in) in diameter with up to 150 scales.

The seeds are tan in colour, around 12 mm (0.5 in) long with wings up to 15 mm (0.6 in) wide.

== Taxonomy ==
This species was first described by Australian botanist Bernard Hyland, based on specimens he collected from the Bellenden Ker Range in 1972. His paper, titled "A revision of the genus Agathis (Araucariaceae) in Australia", was published in 1978 in the journal Brunonia, which is now known as Australian Systematic Botany.

=== Etymology ===
The genus name Agathis is from the Ancient Greek word ἀγαθίς 'ball of thread', a reference to the appearance of the female cones. The species epithet atropurpurea is a combination of the Latin words āter 'dark', and purpura 'purple', and refers to the dark blue/purple colour of the bark.

== Distribution and habitat ==
The range of Agathis atropurpurea is confined to a number of small fragmented populations within the Wet Tropics of Queensland, specifically to the cloudy, high elevation, simple microphyll vine-fern forests that occur on the granite massifs north and south of Cairns. These are areas of high rainfall—more than 2,000 mm (79 in) per year—at elevations from 700 m (2,300 ft) to 1,600 m (5,200 ft), and include places such as Mount Pieter Botte, Mount Lewis National Park, the Lamb Range, the Bellenden Ker Range, and the high ranges of the western Atherton Tableland.

The blue kauri favours granite and rhyolite soils, and is often associated with species such as Balanops australiana, Ceratopetalum succirubrum, Ceratopetalum virchowii, Doryphora aromatica, Elaeocarpus ferruginiflorus, Flindersia bourjotiana, Syzygium cryptophlebium, Sundacarpus amarus, Trochocarpa bellendenkerensis, Uromyrtus species, and Xanthostemon pubescens.

== Conservation ==
In the state of Queensland, to which this species is endemic, the blue kauri is regarded by Queensland's Department of the Environment, Tourism, Science and Innovation as having no threats and is classified as least concern (LC). It is not listed in the Queensland Confidential Species list, which seeks to limit publication of location data for at-risk species.

In contrast, the International Union for Conservation of Nature (IUCN) has assessed the species as near-threatened (NT), citing invasive species, the existence of Phytophthora cinnamomi in part of the blue kauri's range, and climate change as potential threats to the species. The IUCN notes that no assessment of these potential threats has been conducted, and that the population of the blue kauri is currently stable.

== Gallery ==
Mature tree at about 1250 metres above sea level in Dindin National Park

Trunk, in Dindin National Park

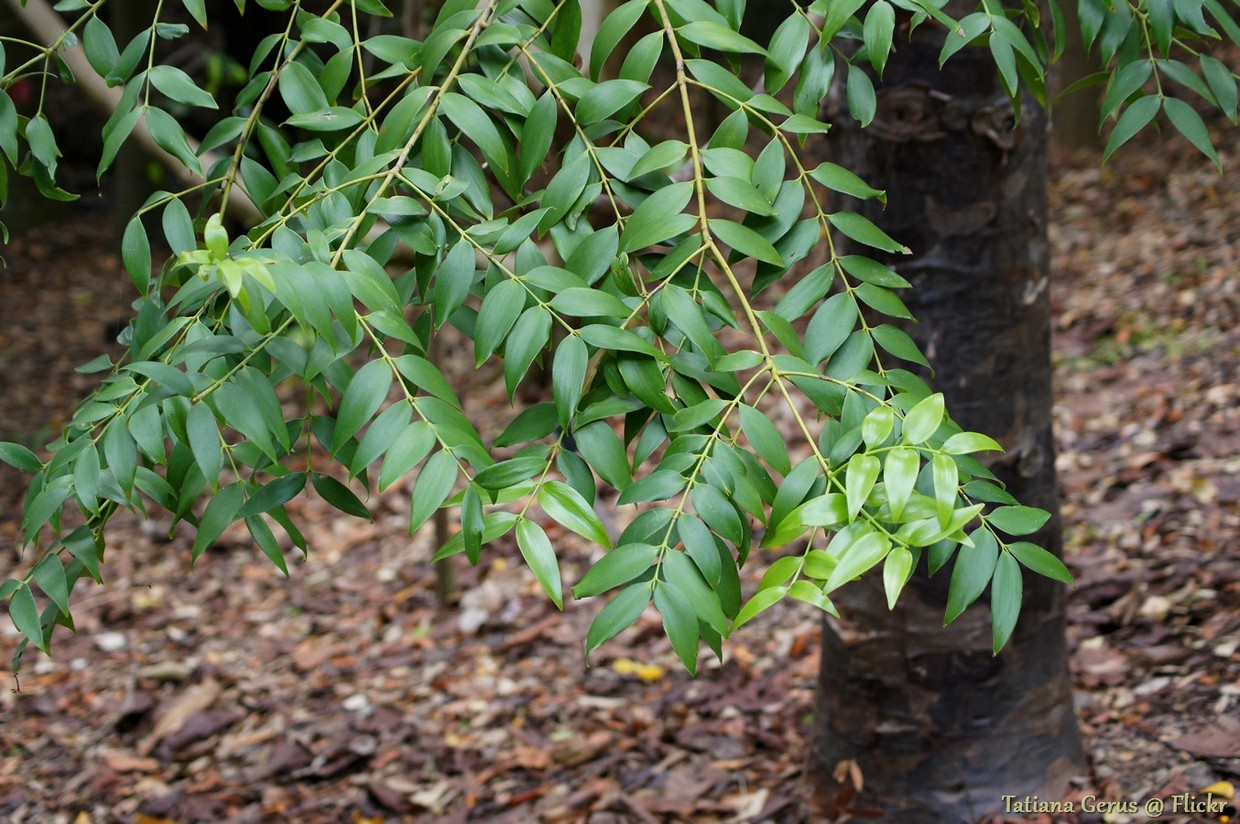
Foliage

Waxy resin leaking from a wound on the trunk

Female cone
