= Agathis zamunerae =

Agathis zamunerae Temporal range: Early-Mid Eocene ~52.2–47.7 Ma

Scientific classification
- Kingdom: Plantae
- Clade: Embryophytes
- Clade: Tracheophytes
- Clade: Gymnosperms
- Division: Pinophyta
- Class: Pinopsida
- Order: Araucariales
- Family: Araucariaceae
- Genus: Agathis
- Species: A. zamunerae

Binomial name
- Agathis zamunerae Wilf 2005

Extinct species of conifer

Agathis zamunerae is an extinct species of coniferous tree in the family Araucariaceae, known from the Early and Middle Eocene rainforest paleofloras of the Ligorio Márquez and Ventana Formations, Patagonia, Argentina. The genus existed roughly from 52.2 to 47.75 million years ego.
