= Agathis lenticula =

Conservation status
- Vulnerable (IUCN 3.1)

Scientific classification
- Kingdom: Plantae
- Clade: Tracheophytes
- Clade: Gymnosperms
- Division: Pinophyta
- Class: Pinopsida
- Order: Araucariales
- Family: Araucariaceae
- Genus: Agathis
- Species: A. lenticula

Binomial name
- Agathis lenticula de Laub.

Species of conifer

Agathis lenticula is a species of coniferous tree in the family Araucariaceae, endemic to Borneo. The specific epithet lenticula is from the Latin meaning "like a double-convex lens", referring to the leaf shape.

== Description ==
Agathis lenticula grows as a tree up to 45 metres (150 ft) tall. Its bark is greyish brown. The male cones are cylindrical in shape, the female ones spherical.

== Distribution and habitat ==
Agathis lenticula is endemic to Borneo. Its habitat is montane rainforest at altitudes of 1,000–1,700 m (3,300–5,600 ft).
