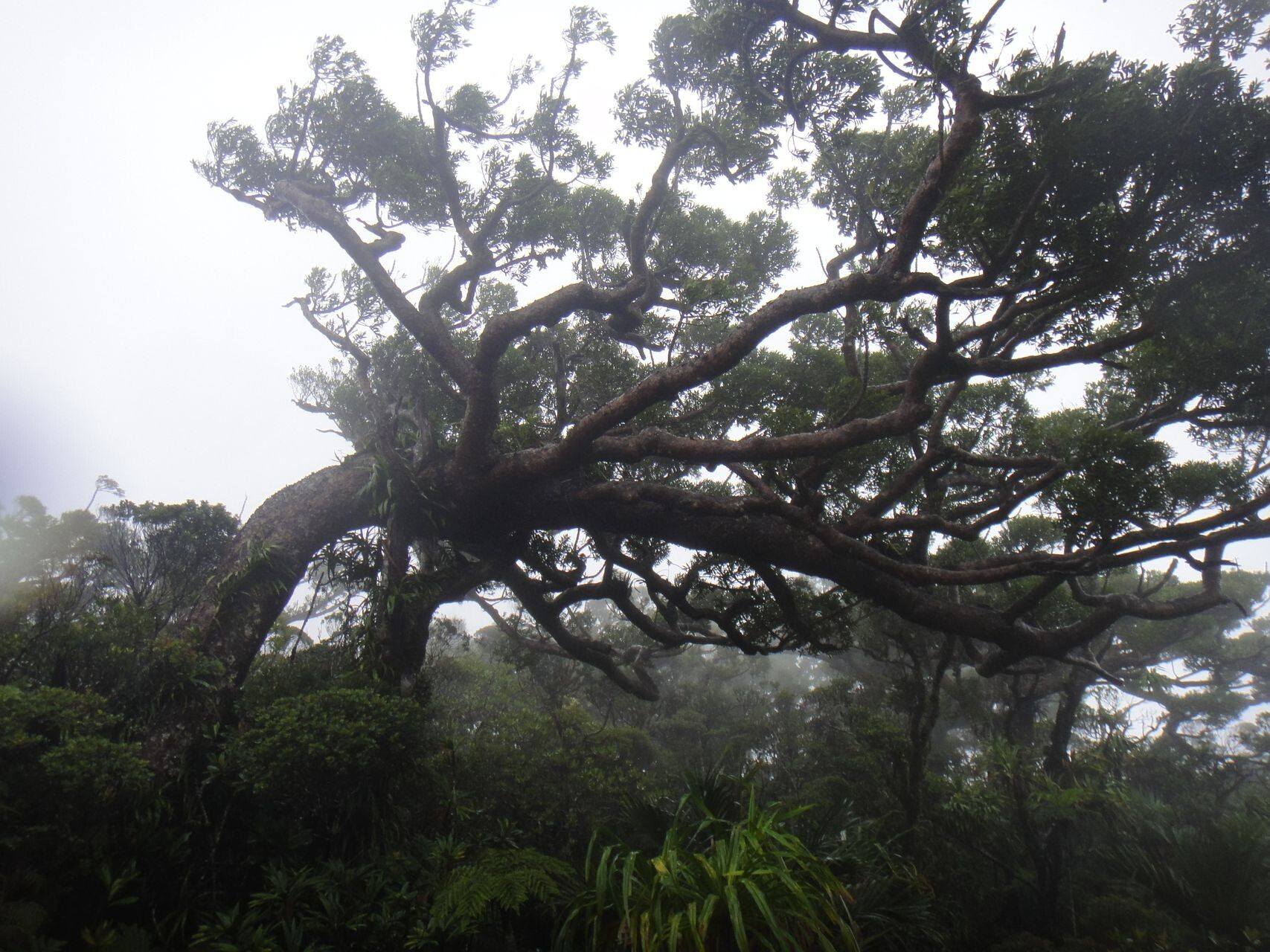

Conservation status
- Critically Endangered (IUCN 3.1)

Scientific classification
- Kingdom: Plantae
- Clade: Embryophytes
- Clade: Tracheophytes
- Clade: Spermatophytes
- Clade: Gymnosperms
- Division: Pinophyta
- Class: Pinopsida
- Order: Araucariales
- Family: Araucariaceae
- Genus: Agathis
- Species: A. montana

Binomial name
- Agathis montana de Laub.

Synonyms
- Salisburyodendron montana (de Laub.) A.V.Bobrov & Melikyan

= Agathis montana =

Mount Panié kauri

Species of conifer

Agathis montana, the Mount Panié kauri, is a species of conifer in the family Araucariaceae that is endemic to the higher elevations of Mont Panié in New Caledonia. The Latin specific epithet montana refers to mountains or coming from mountains. Its native name is "Dayu Biik" in Nemi and Fwâi. It is a long-living species, with one recently dead tree of 80 m estimated to be 1,100–1,300 years old based on ^{14}C dating. It is threatened by feral pigs, Phytophthora disease, bark beetles and climate change.
