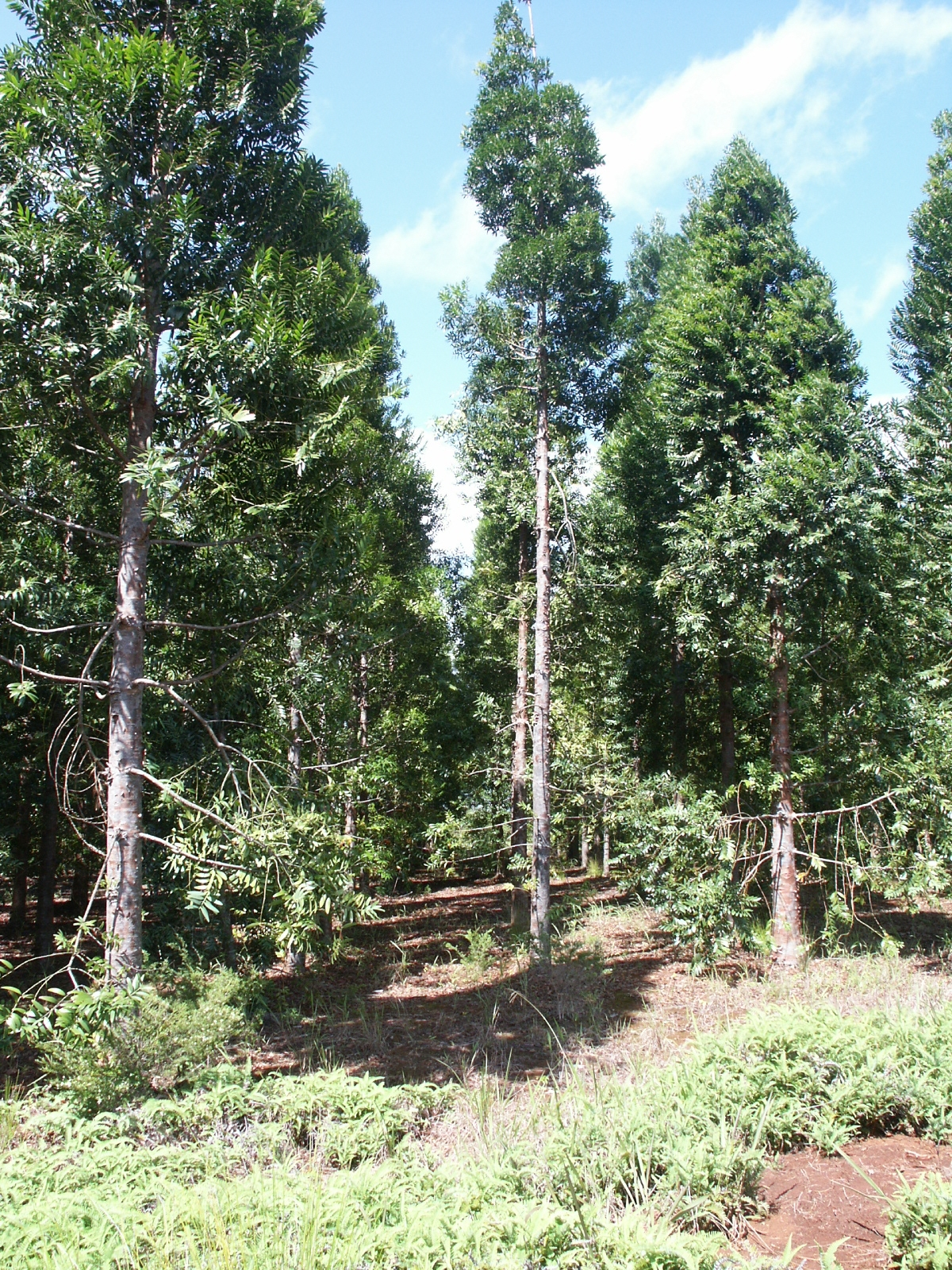

Conservation status
- Vulnerable (IUCN 3.1)

Scientific classification
- Kingdom: Plantae
- Clade: Tracheophytes
- Clade: Gymnosperms
- Division: Pinophyta
- Class: Pinopsida
- Order: Araucariales
- Family: Araucariaceae
- Genus: Agathis
- Species: A. lanceolata

Binomial name
- Agathis lanceolata Warb.

Synonyms
- Dammara lanceolata Lindl. ex Pancher & Sebert, nom. illeg. homonym. post.; Dammara ovata C.Moore ex Seem., nom. illeg. homonym. post.; Salisburyodendron lanceolata A.V.Bobrov & Melikyan

= Agathis lanceolata =

Species of conifer

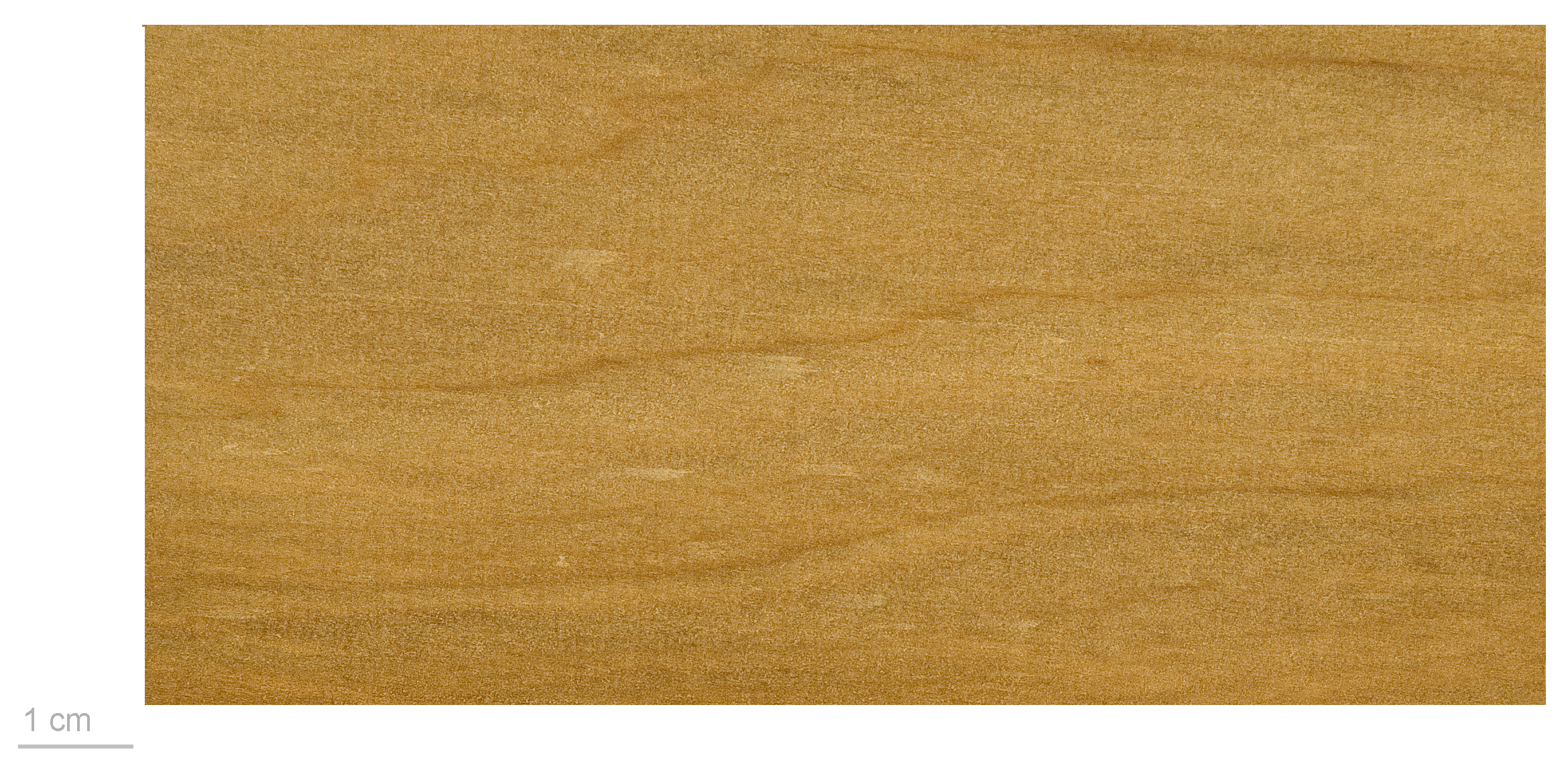
Agathis lanceolata - MHNT

Agathis lanceolata is a species of conifer in the family Araucariaceae. It is a tree endemic to New Caledonia. It is concentrated in the southern Massif of Grande Terre, New Caledonia's main island, with northern outliers near Bopope on the Boulinda and Mé Maoya massifs. It is a large emergent tree in dense humid rain forests on ultramafic soils from 100 to 900 metres elevation. It is threatened by habitat loss.
