= Agathis labillardierei =

- Herbarium specimen from Kew Gardens

Conservation status
- Near Threatened (IUCN 3.1)

Scientific classification
- Kingdom: Plantae
- Clade: Tracheophytes
- Clade: Gymnosperms
- Division: Pinophyta
- Class: Pinopsida
- Order: Araucariales
- Family: Araucariaceae
- Genus: Agathis
- Species: A. labillardierei

Binomial name
- Agathis labillardierei Warb.

Species of conifer

Agathis labillardierei, also known as New Guinea kauri, is a species of conifer in the family Araucariaceae. It is native to the island of New Guinea, where it is found in both Papua New Guinea and Western New Guinea.

This is a long-lived tree that can be found in several habitat types, including peat swamp forest and mountain forests on soils of serpentine and limestone. It is one of the most valuable timber species in the area and it is threatened by logging.
