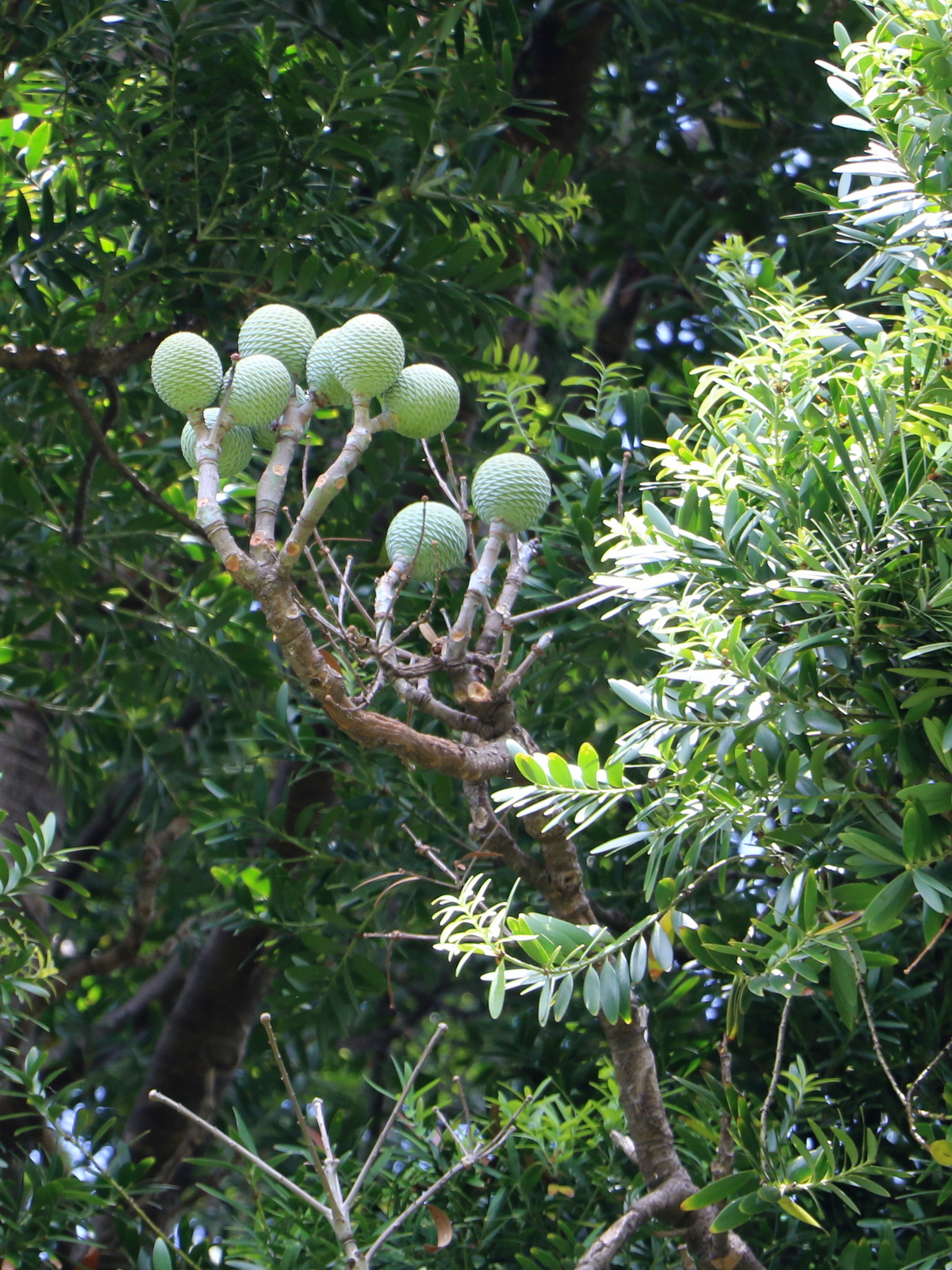
- Royal Botanic Gardens Sydney

Conservation status
- Vulnerable (IUCN 3.1)

Scientific classification
- Kingdom: Plantae
- Clade: Tracheophytes
- Clade: Gymnosperms
- Division: Pinophyta
- Class: Pinopsida
- Order: Araucariales
- Family: Araucariaceae
- Genus: Agathis
- Species: A. moorei

Binomial name
- Agathis moorei (Lindl.) Mast.

Synonyms
- Agathis corbassonii de Laub.; Dammara lanceolata Vieill.; Dammara moorei Lindl.; Salisburyodendron corbassonii (de Laub.) A.V.Bobrov & Melikyan; Salisburyodendron moorei (Lindl.) A.V.Bobrov & Melikyan

= Agathis moorei =

Species of conifer

Agathis moorei is a species of coniferous tree in the family Araucariaceae, endemic to New Caledonia. It occurs scattered throughout the main island in subtropical rainforest at altitudes of 30 metres (100 ft) to 850 m (2,800 ft). It is threatened by habitat loss.

== Description ==
It is a medium-sized tree growing up to 30 metres (100 ft) tall. The leaves are in decussate opposite pairs, 5–7 cm (2–3 in) long (up to 20 cm (8 in) long on young plants) and 8–12 mm (0.3–0.5 in) broad. The cones are ovoid, up to 15 cm (6 in) long and 12 cm (5 in) diameter, and disintegrate at maturity to release the winged seeds.

== Taxonomy ==
Agathis corbassonii was previously considered a distinct species but since 2010 has been synonymous with Agathis moorei.
