= Agathis silbae =

Conservation status
- Near Threatened (IUCN 3.1)

Scientific classification
- Kingdom: Plantae
- Clade: Tracheophytes
- Clade: Gymnosperms
- Division: Pinophyta
- Class: Pinopsida
- Order: Araucariales
- Family: Araucariaceae
- Genus: Agathis
- Species: A. silbae

Binomial name
- Agathis silbae de Laub. (1987)

Species of conifer

Agathis silbae is a species of conifer in the family Araucariaceae. It is endemic to the island of Espiritu Santo in Vanuatu.

The species is the Cumberland Peninsula and Mount Tabwemasana, also known as Santo Peak, on the west coast of Espiritu Santo, from 450 to 760 meters elevation. It is a large emergent tree in lower mountain rainforest on the wetter western and northwestern slopes of Espiritu Santo's central mountain range, with an average annual rainfall of about 4,500 mm. Associated trees include Calophyllum neo-ebudicum, Cryptocarya turbinata, Dysoxylum sp., Myristica sp., and Podocarpus sp.

The species is threatened by habitat loss, and is assessed as near-threatened. It has estimated extent of occurrence (EOO) of about 2,000 km^{2} and an estimated area of occupancy (AOO) of more than 10 km^{2} and less than 100 km^{2}.

The species was described in 1987, and is named after New York botanist John Silba. The species is accepted by Plants of the World Online. The Forestry Department in Vanuatu recognise it as a synonym of Agathis macrophylla.
