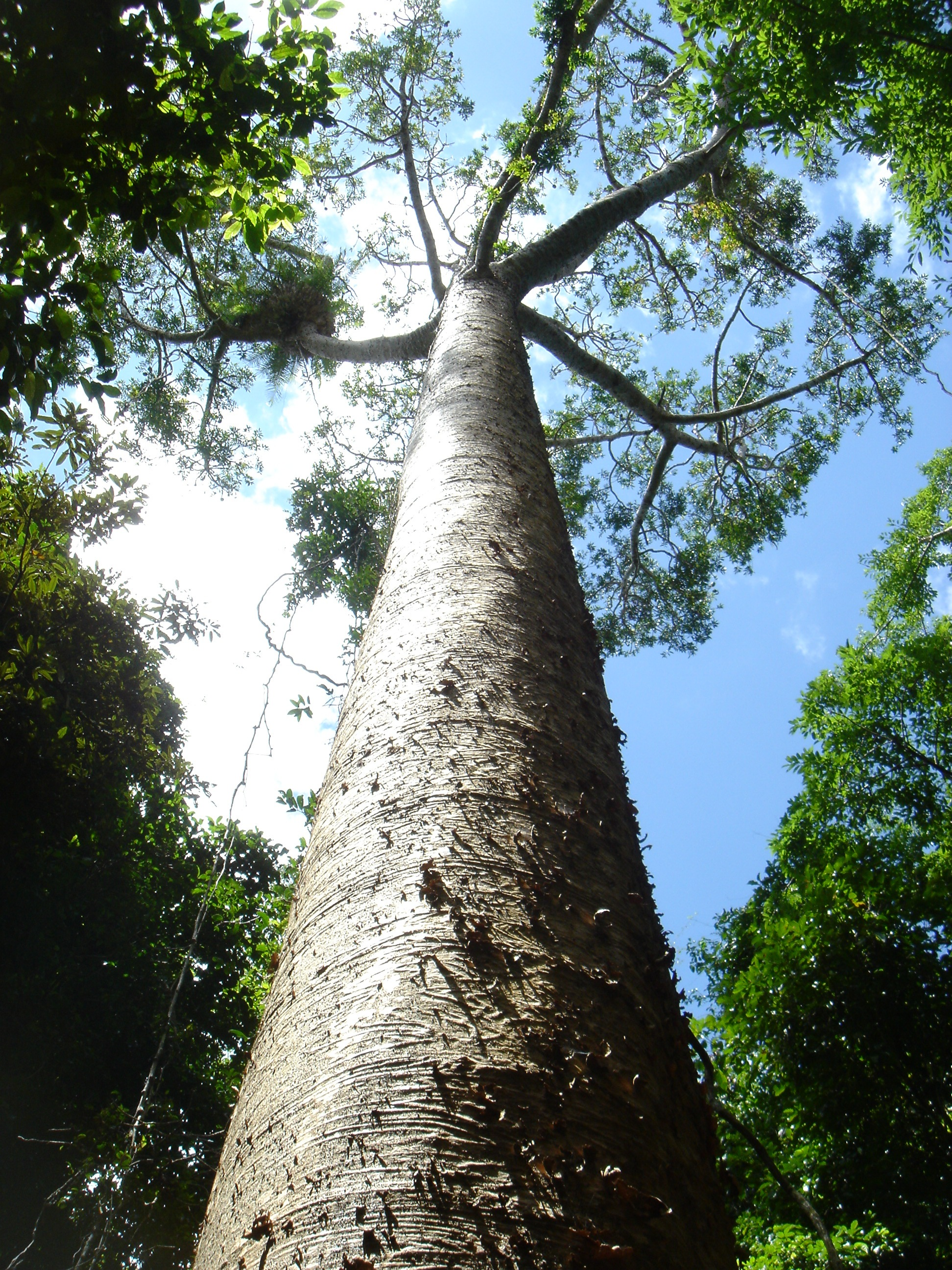
- At Lake Barrine circuit walk, Atherton Tablelands, Queensland

Conservation status
- Near Threatened (IUCN 3.1)

Scientific classification
- Kingdom: Plantae
- Clade: Tracheophytes
- Clade: Gymnospermae
- Division: Pinophyta
- Class: Pinopsida
- Order: Araucariales
- Family: Araucariaceae
- Genus: Agathis
- Species: A. microstachya

Binomial name
- Agathis microstachya J.F.Bailey & C.White

= Agathis microstachya =

Bull kauri

Species of tree native to Australia

Agathis microstachya, the bull kauri, is a species of conifer in the family Araucariaceae, endemic to Australia. It was described in 1918 by John Frederick Bailey and Cyril Tenison White. It is threatened by habitat loss.

== Description ==
A. microstachya grows up to about 50 m (160 ft) in height and 2.7 m (8 ft 10 in) in diameter. The trunk is unbuttressed, straight and with little taper. Distinctive features are coarse, flaky bark, medium-sized cones with 160–210 scales, and leaves with numerous longitudinal, parallel veins.

== Distribution ==
It has a very restricted distribution, being almost limited to the Atherton Tableland in Far North Queensland, with its elevational range 400–900 m (1,300–3,000 ft) above sea level.

== Timber ==
The wood has an even texture, is easy to work and polishes well. The heartwood is cream to pale brown in colour. It is soft and light with a density of about 480 kg/m^{3} (30 lb/cu ft). It is not durable in contact with the ground, but can be used for house framing and flooring.

== Notes ==
- Boland, D.J.; Brooker, M.I.H.; Chippendale, G.M.; Hall, N.; Hyland, B.P.M.; Johnston, R.D.; Kleinig, D.A.; & Turner, J.D. (1984). Forest Trees of Australia. (4th edition). Thomas Nelson, Australia; and CSIRO: Melbourne. ISBN 0-17-006264-3.
- Agathis microstachya at www.conifers.org https://web.archive.org/web/20080501225647/http://www.conifers.org/ar/ag/microstachya.html]
