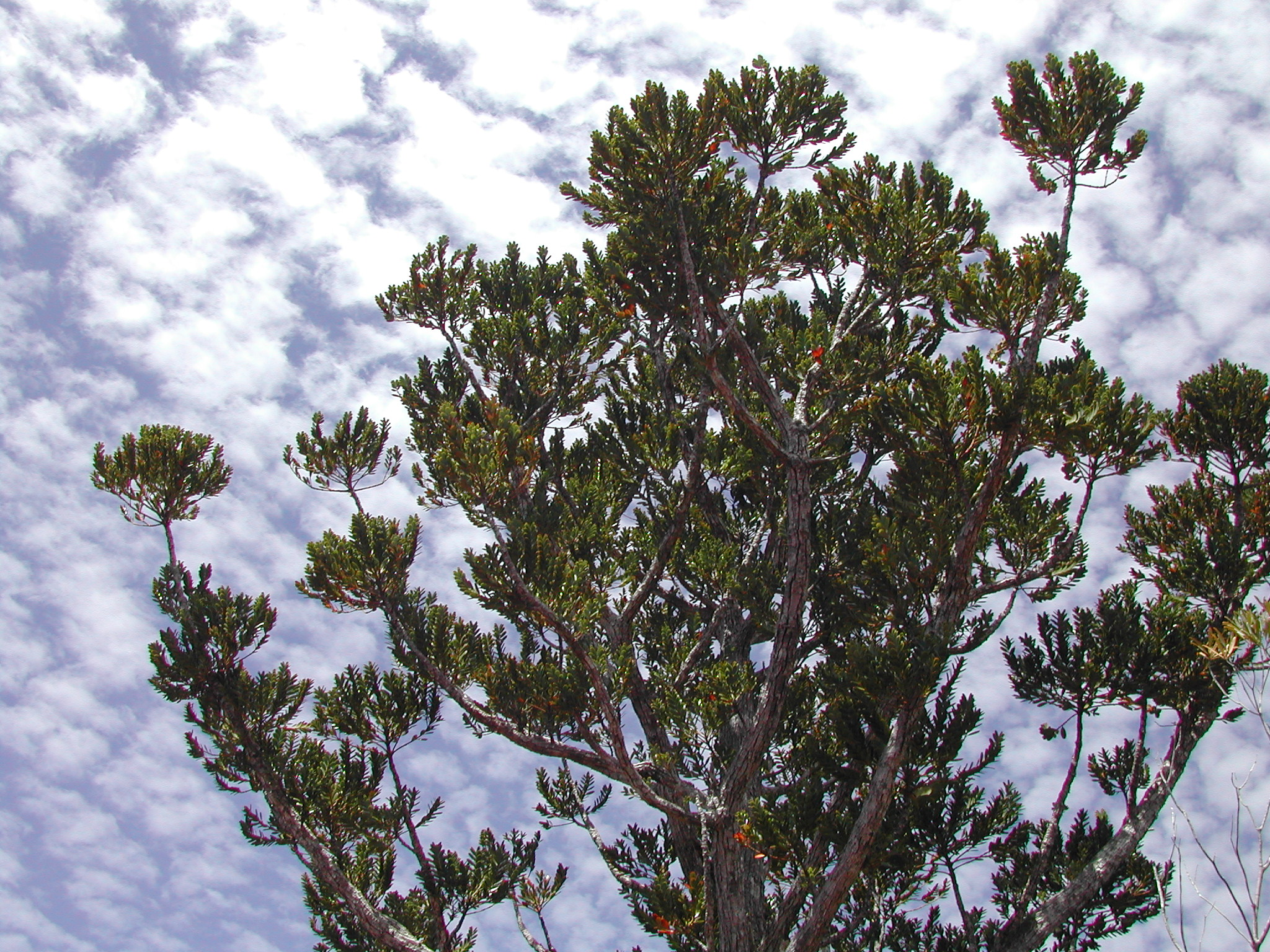
- At Yaté, New Caledonia

Conservation status
- Vulnerable (IUCN 3.1)

Scientific classification
- Kingdom: Plantae
- Clade: Tracheophytes
- Clade: Gymnosperms
- Division: Pinophyta
- Class: Pinopsida
- Order: Araucariales
- Family: Araucariaceae
- Genus: Agathis
- Species: A. ovata

Binomial name
- Agathis ovata Moore ex Vieill. Warb.

= Agathis ovata =

Species of conifer

Agathis ovata, the mountain kauri or scrub kauri, is a species of conifer in the family Araucariaceae. It is endemic to the southwest Pacific island of New Caledonia, where it occurs mainly toward the southeastern end of the island, but with two small isolated populations further northwest. It is threatened by habitat loss.

== Habitat ==
Agathis ovata is found in montane scrubland or in forests, although it requires a high level of rainfall so is generally restricted to between 150 and 1000 metres. Agathis were once found worldwide, although species such as this are now becoming very restricted. Agathis ovata is at a high risk of extinction from logging of tall forest trees and mining activities which clear its habitat.

== Description ==
It is a medium-sized tree, growing to 25 metres tall with a straight trunk in forests, although on the scrubland where it is more common it is a large shrub or small tree, branching from the base upwards with a broad, flat, crown and 1–8 metres tall. The bark has deep fissures, and is normally whitish-tan on the outside and red-brown on the underside. The leaves are oval, 4–8 cm long and 1–5 cm wide, with a rounded apex. The cones are globose, up to 12 cm long and 10 cm wide, and (like all Agathis) disintegrate when mature to release the seeds.

== Gallery ==
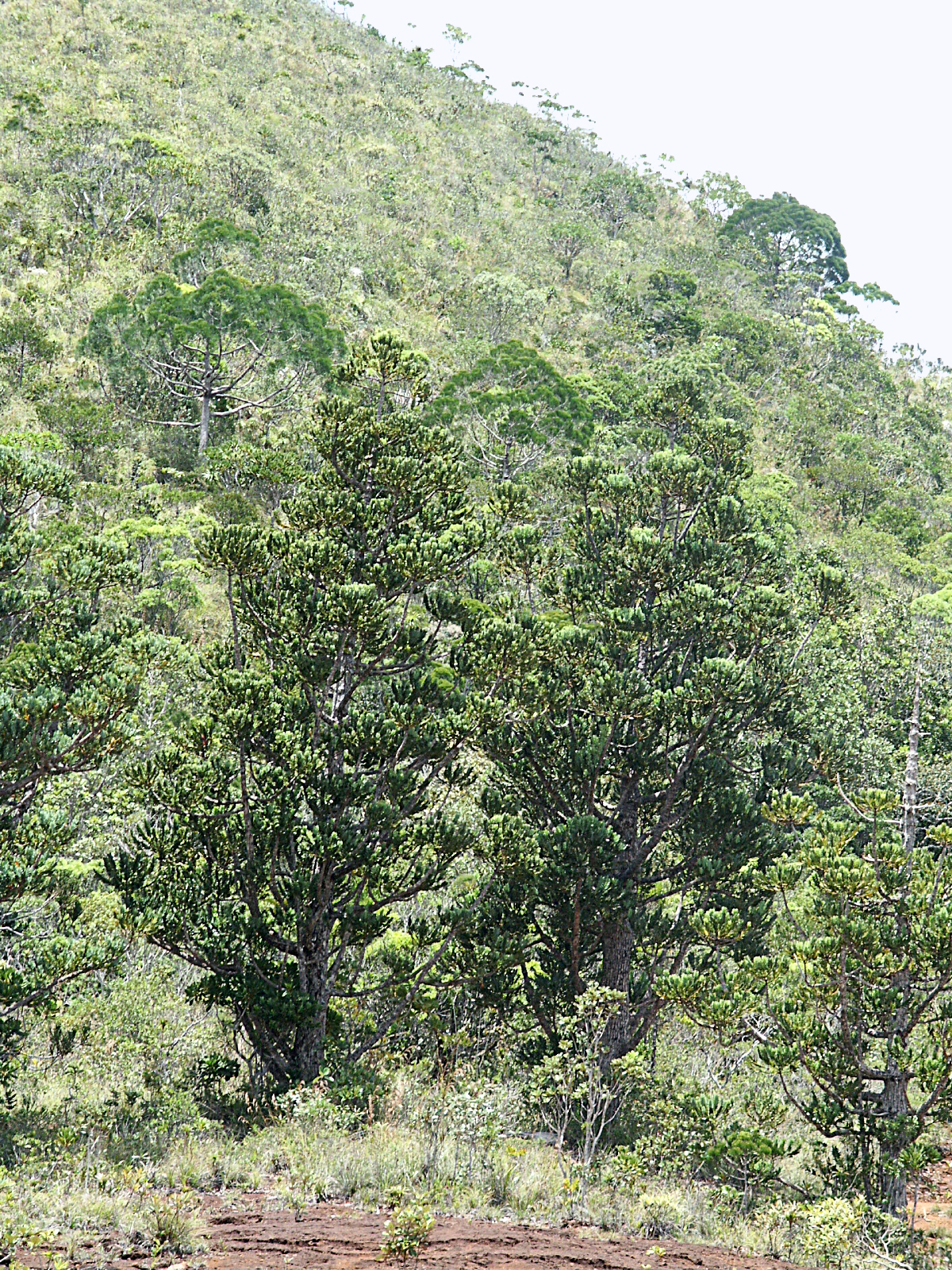

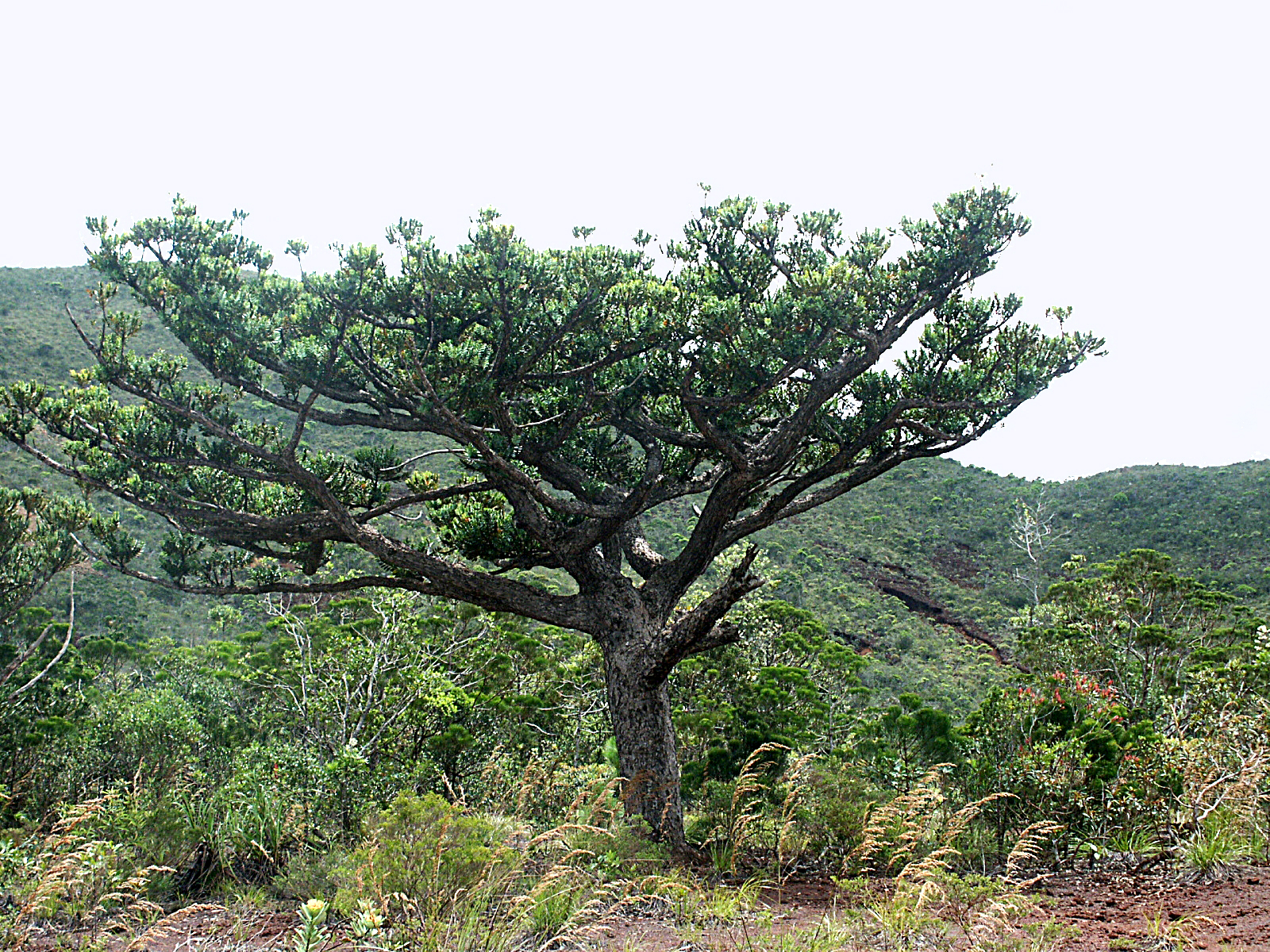

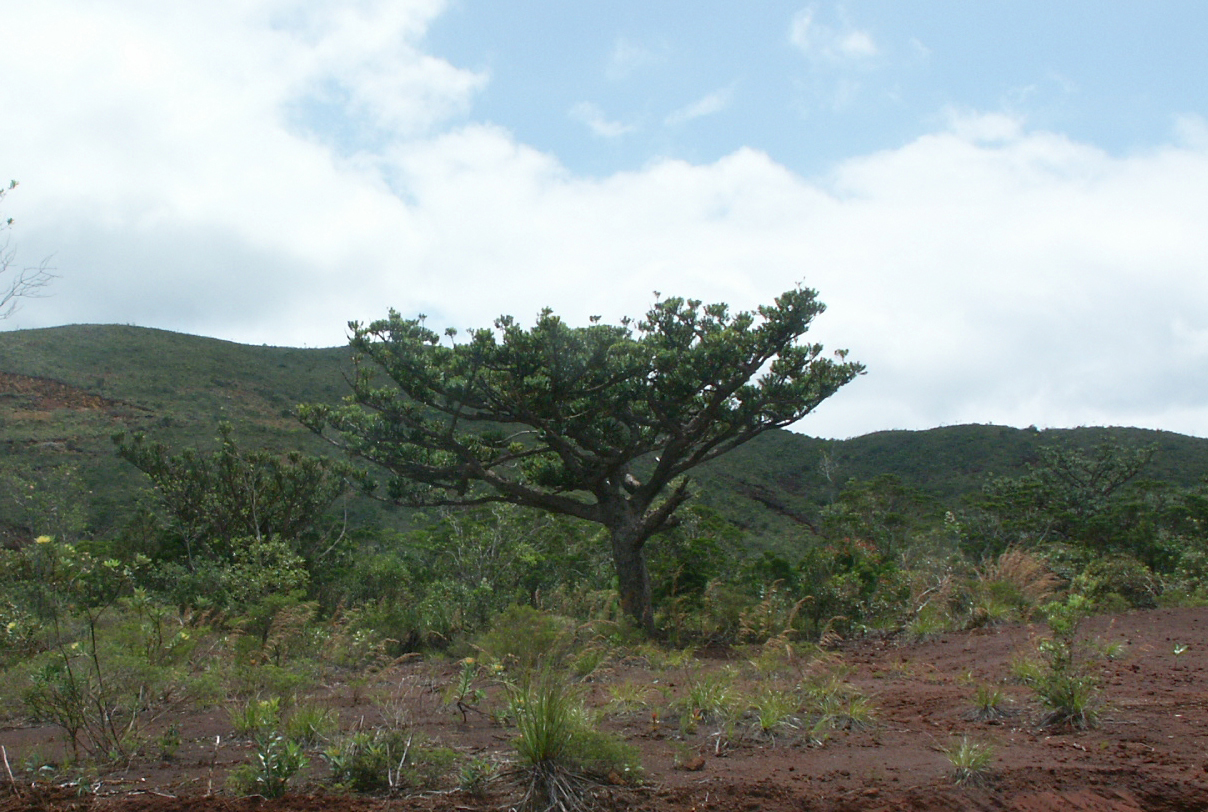
