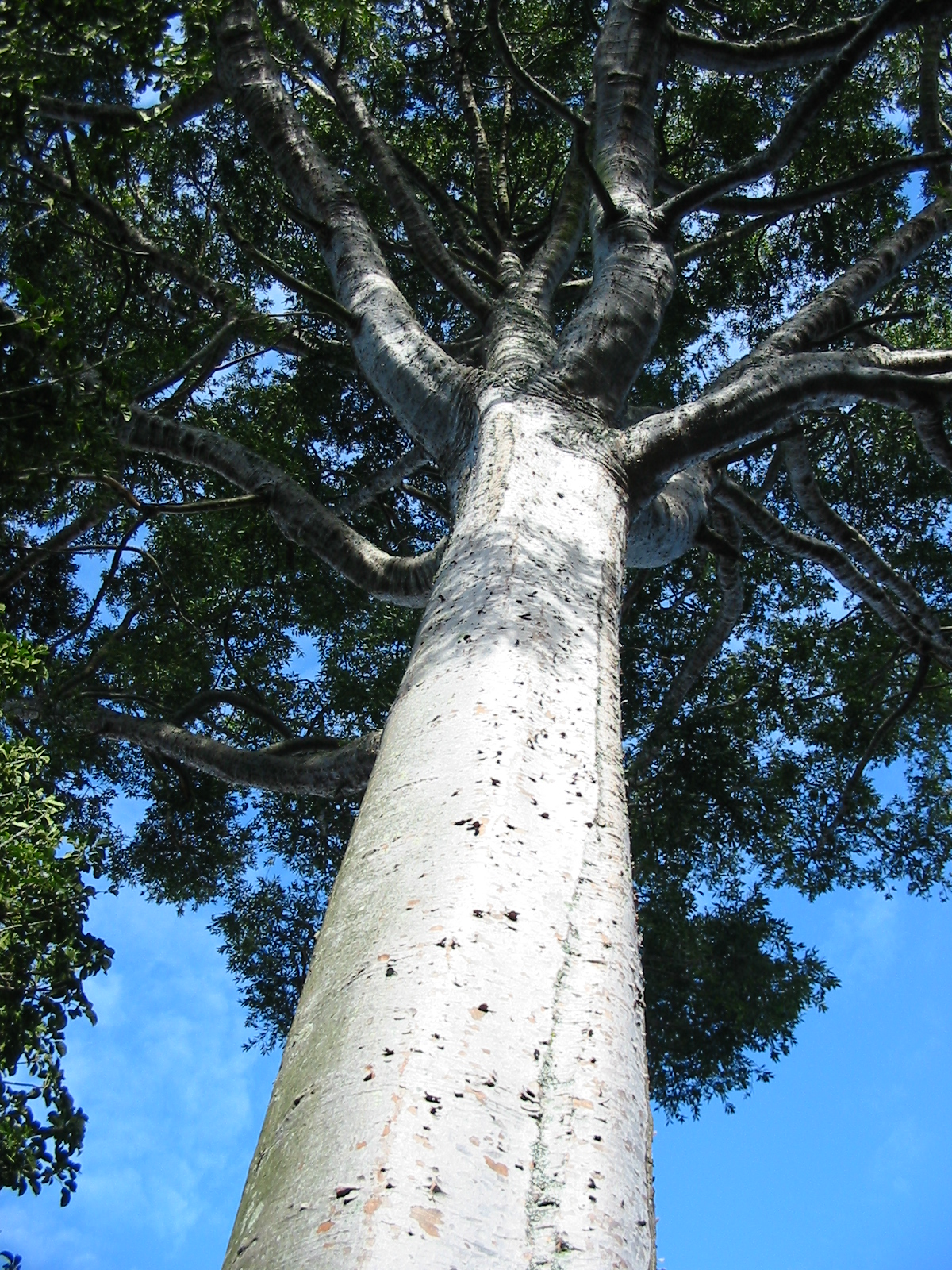
- Agathis robusta Eastern Australia

Scientific classification
- Kingdom: Plantae
- Clade: Tracheophytes
- Clade: Gymnosperms
- Division: Pinophyta
- Class: Pinopsida
- Order: Araucariales
- Family: Araucariaceae
- Genus: Agathis; Salisb.

Type species
- Agathis loranthifolia Salisb.
- Distribution of Agathis species

Synonyms
- Dammara (Rumph.) Lam. ex Link; Salisburyodendron A.V.Bobrov & Melikyan

= Agathis =

Agathis Temporal range: Paleocene to recent 64.67–0 Ma Possible Cenomanian record

Genus of coniferous trees

Agathis, known by the common names kauri and dammara, is a genus of coniferous trees native to Australasia and Southeast Asia. It is one of three extant genera in the family Araucariaceae, alongside Wollemia and Araucaria (being more closely related to the former). Its leaves are much broader than most conifers. Kauri gum was historically commercially harvested from living New Zealand kauri and from swamp ground. They are mainly tropical conifers, however a few species are found in temperate climates.

== Description ==
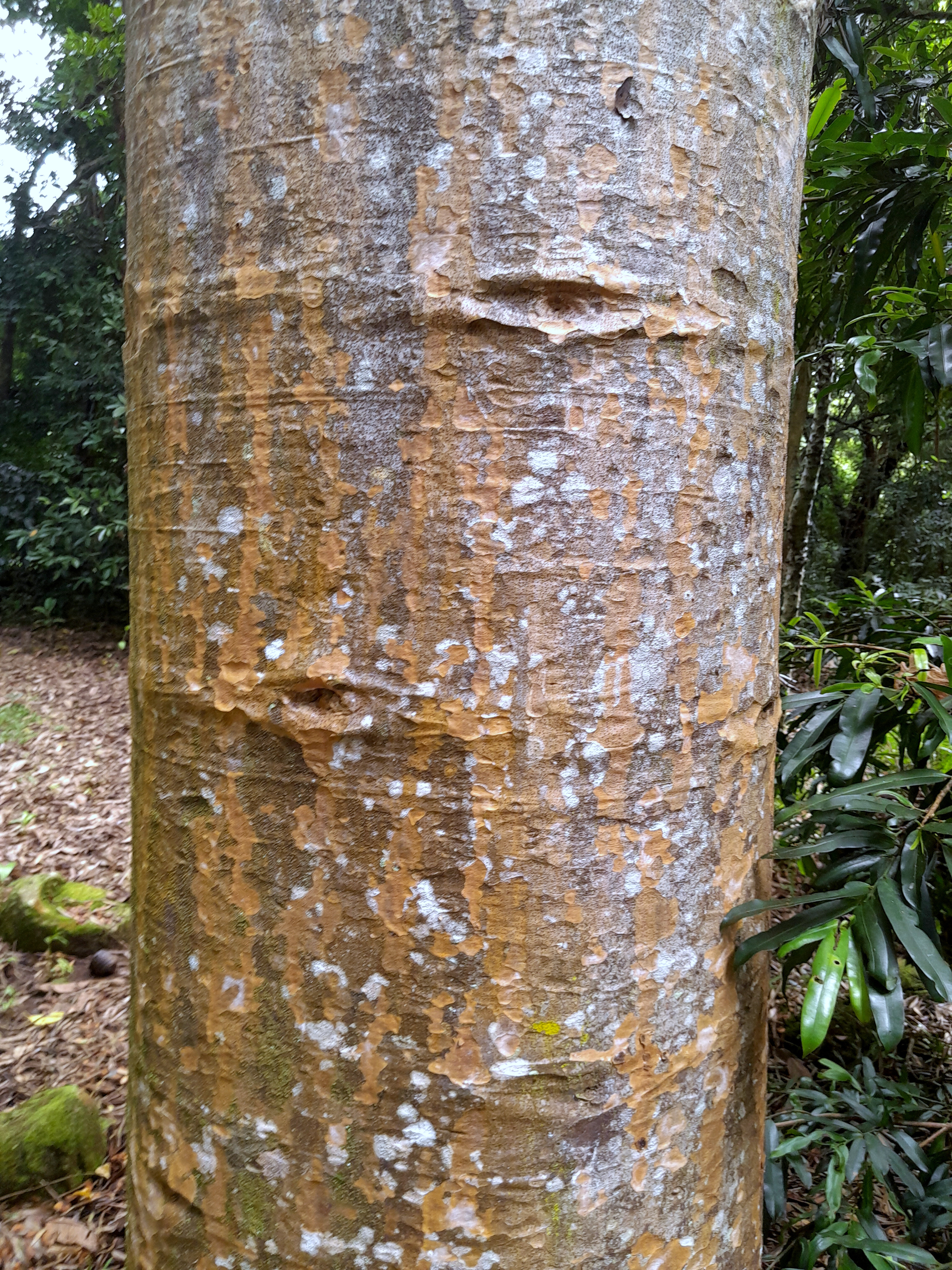
Trunk of Agathis robusta at Cairns Botanic Gardens

Mature kauri trees have characteristically large trunks, with little or no branching below the crown. In contrast, young trees are normally conical in shape, forming a more rounded or irregularly shaped crown as they achieve maturity.

The bark is smooth and light grey to grey-brown, usually peeling into irregular flakes that become thicker on more mature trees. The branch structure is often horizontal or, when larger, ascending. The lowest branches often leave annular branch scars when they detach from the lower trunk.

The juvenile leaves in all species are larger than the adult, more or less acute, varying among the species from ovate to lanceolate. Adult leaves are opposite, elliptical to linear, very leathery and quite thick. Young leaves are often a coppery-red, contrasting markedly with the usually green or glaucous-green foliage of the previous season.

The male pollen cones appear usually only on larger trees after seed cones have appeared. The female seed cones usually develop on short lateral branchlets, maturing after two years. They are normally oval or globe shaped. Agathis is monoecious.

Seeds of some species are attacked by the caterpillars of Agathiphaga, some of the most primitive of all living moths.

== Uses ==
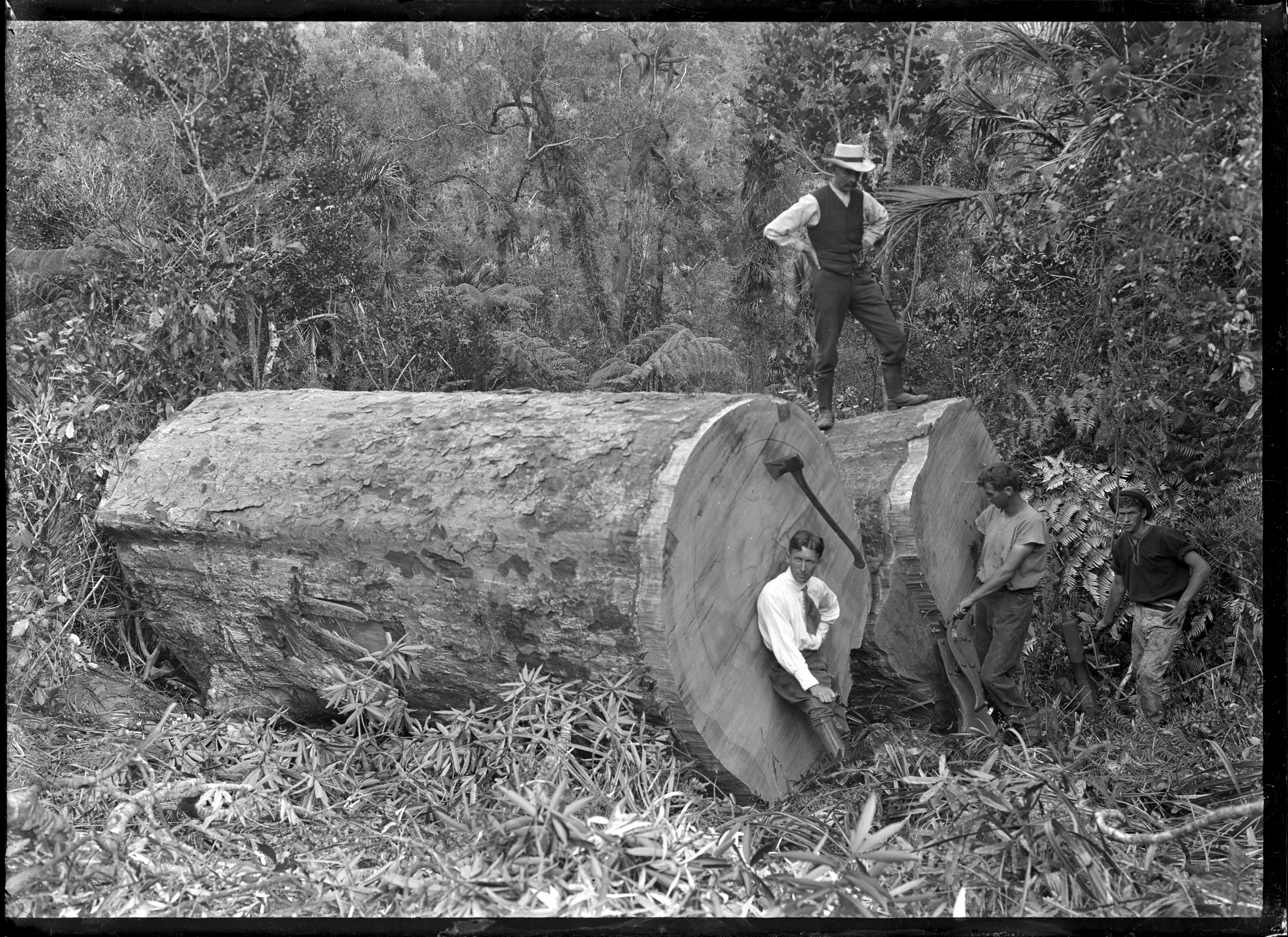
Agathis australis logs and loggers near Piha

Various species of kauri give diverse resins such as kauri gum. The timber is generally straight-grained and of fine quality with an exceptional strength-to-weight ratio and rot resistance, making it ideal for yacht hull construction. The wood is commonly used in the manufacture of guitars and ukuleles due to its low density and relatively low price of production. It is also used for some Go boards (goban). The uses of the New Zealand species (A. australis) included shipbuilding, house construction, wood panelling, furniture making, mine braces, and railway sleepers. Due to the hard resin of the wood, it was the traditionally preferred material used by Māori for wooden weapons, patu aruhe (fernroot beaters) and barkcloth beaters.

== Evolutionary history ==
Within Araucariaceae, it is thought that Agathis and Wollemia share a common ancestor which lived between 90 and 55 million years ago, and the two genera form a sister clade to the older Araucaria. The oldest fossils currently confidently assignable to Agathis are those of Agathis immortalis from the Salamanca Formation of Patagonia, which dates to the Paleocene, approximately 64.67–63.49 million years ago. Agathis-like leaves are also known from the slightly older Lefipán Formation of the same region, which date to the very end of the Cretaceous. Some authors have suggested that Agathis is known from earlier in the Cretaceous (Aptian to Cenomanian in North Africa. Other fossils of the genus are known from the Eocene of Patagonia, the Late Paleocene-Miocene of southern Australia, and the Oligocene–Miocene of New Zealand.

== Species list ==
Phylogeny of Agathis

- Araucariaceae
  - Rostrata
    A. australis
    (Don) Lindley
  - Agathis
    - - - A. atropurpurea
          Hyland
        - A. microstachya
          Bailey & White
      - - A. dammara
          (Lamb.) Richard & Richard
        - A. robusta
          (Moore ex von Mueller) Bailey
    - - - A. labillardierei
          Warburg
        - - A. borneensis
            Warburg
          - A. philippinensis
            Warburg
      - - - A. vitiensis
            (Seemann) Bentham & Hooker
            ex Drake
          - - A. macrophylla
              (Lindley 1851) Masters
            - A. silbae
              de Laubenfels
        - - - A. corbassonii
              de Laubenfels
            - A. lanceolata
              Lindl. ex Warburg
          - - A. ovata
              (Moore ex Vieillard) Warburg
            - - A. moorei
                (Lindley) Masters
              - A. montana
                de Laubenfels

Accepted species

Image	Scientific name	Common name	Distribution
	Agathis atropurpurea	black kauri, blue kauri	Queensland, Australia
	Agathis australis	New Zealand kauri	North Island, New Zealand
	Agathis borneensis	Borneo kauri	western Malesia, Borneo
	Agathis dammara	Sulawesi kauri	Philippines, Sulawesi, Maluku Islands
	Agathis flavescens	Tahan Agathis	Peninsular Malaysia
	Agathis kinabaluensis	Kinabalu kauri	Borneo
	Agathis labillardierei	New Guinea kauri	New Guinea
	Agathis lanceolata	Koghi kauri	New Caledonia
	Agathis lenticula	Sabah kauri	Borneo
	Agathis macrophylla (syn. A. vitiensis)	Pacific kauri, dakua	Fiji, Vanuatu, Solomon Islands
	Agathis microstachya	bull kauri	Queensland, Australia
	Agathis montana		New Caledonia
	Agathis moorei	white kauri	New Caledonia
	Agathis orbicula	Sarawak kauri	Borneo
	Agathis ovata	Scrub kauri	New Caledonia
	Agathis robusta	Queensland kauri	Queensland, Australia; Papua New Guinea
	Agathis robusta subsp. robusta		Queensland and Papua New Guinea
	Agathis robusta subsp. nesophila	New Guinea kauri	Papua New Guinea
	Agathis silbae		Vanuatu
	Agathis zamunerae		Patagonia, South America Argentina

Formerly included

Moved to Nageia

- Agathis motleyi - Nageia motleyi
- Agathis veitchii - Nageia nagi

The placement of the fossil species "Agathis" jurassica from the Late Jurassic of Australia in this genus is doubtful.

== Gallery ==
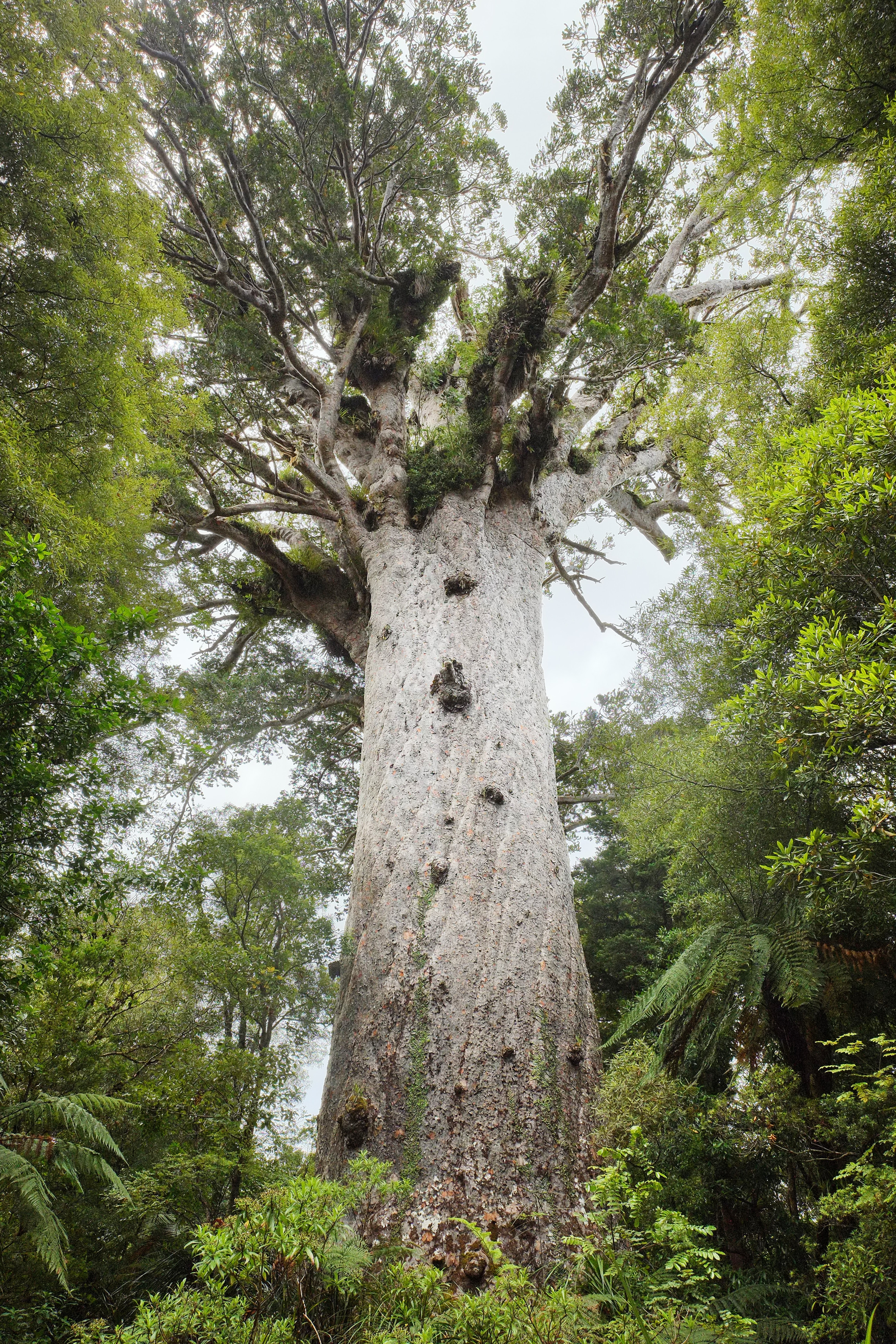
Tāne Mahuta, an Agathis australis in Waipoua Forest, the largest tree in New Zealand by volume

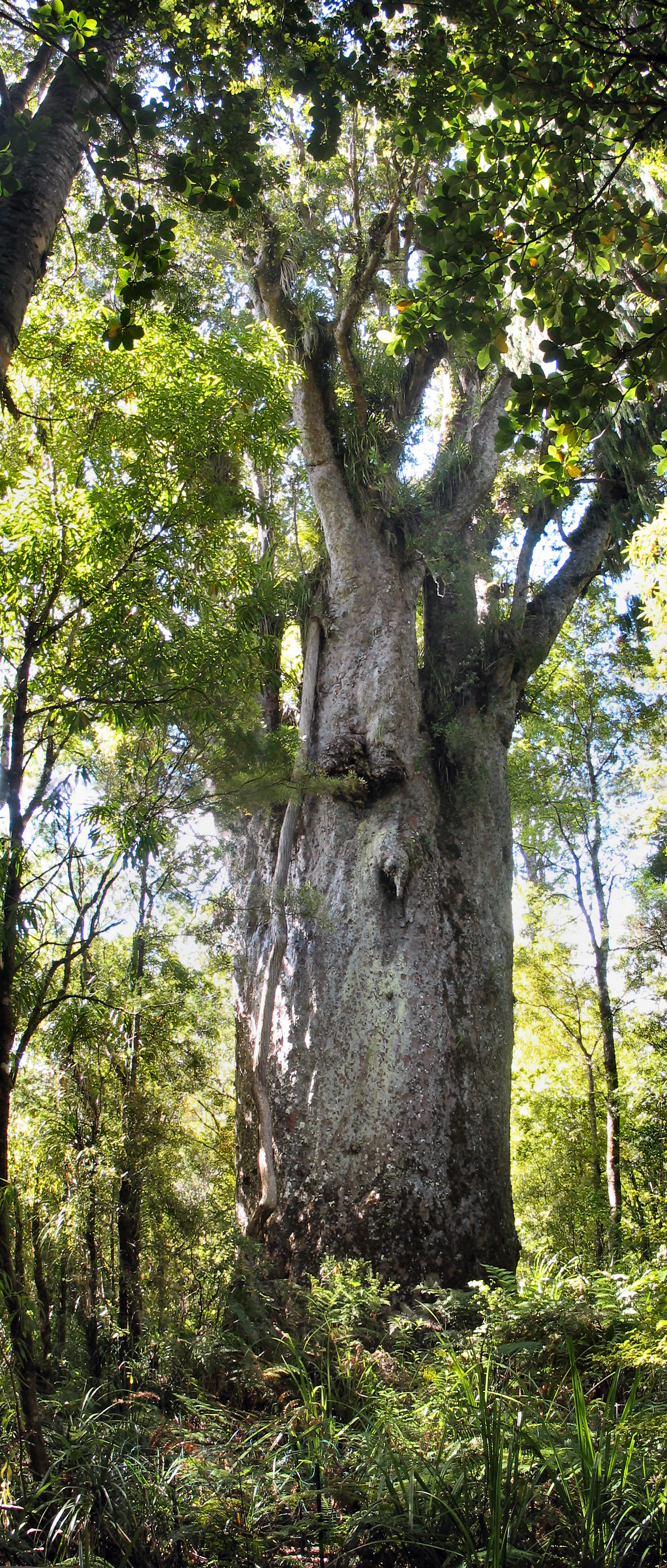
Te Matua Ngahere, an A. australis in Waipoua Forest, the oldest (and 2nd largest) tree in New Zealand

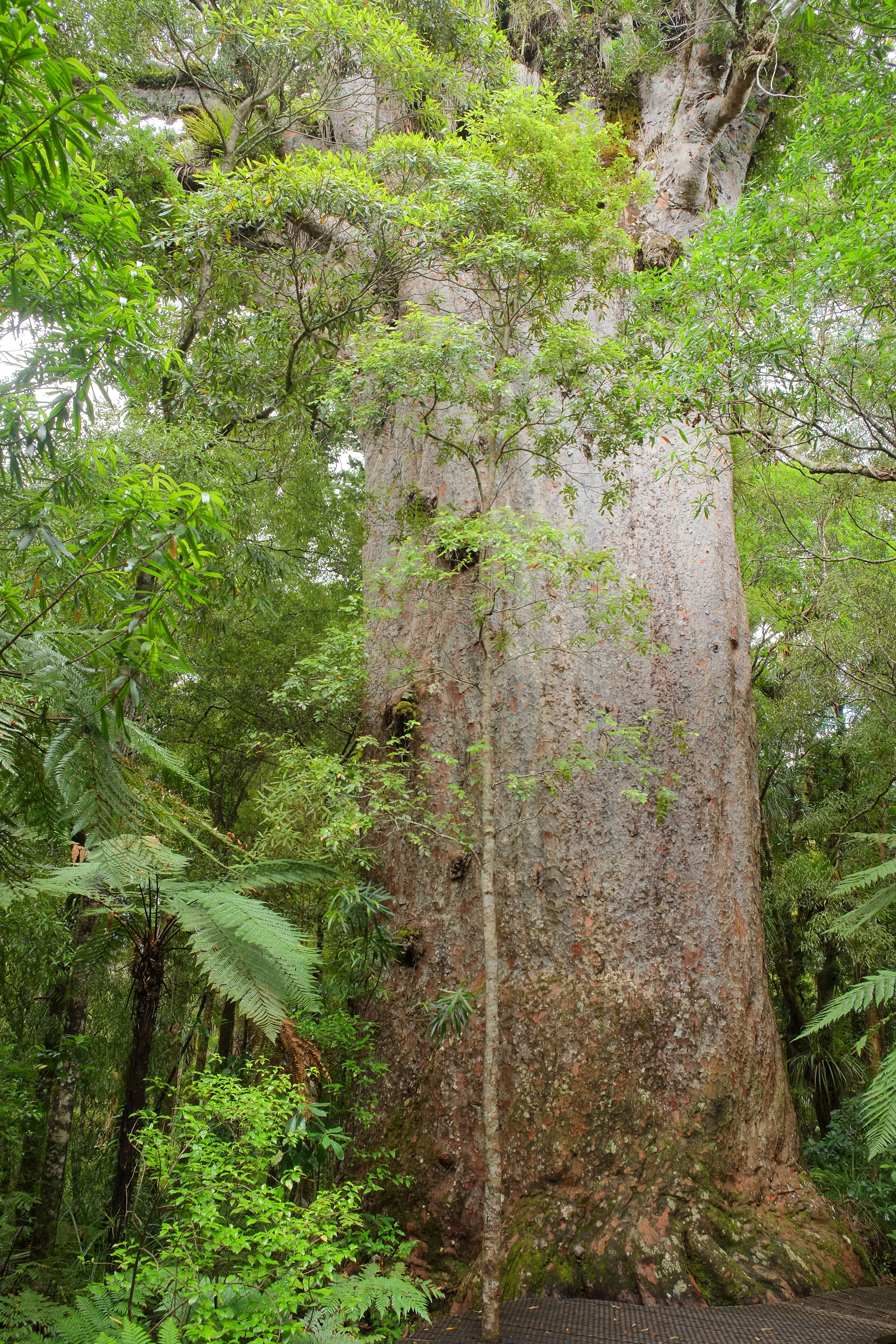
Trunk of the Yakas kauri (7th largest)

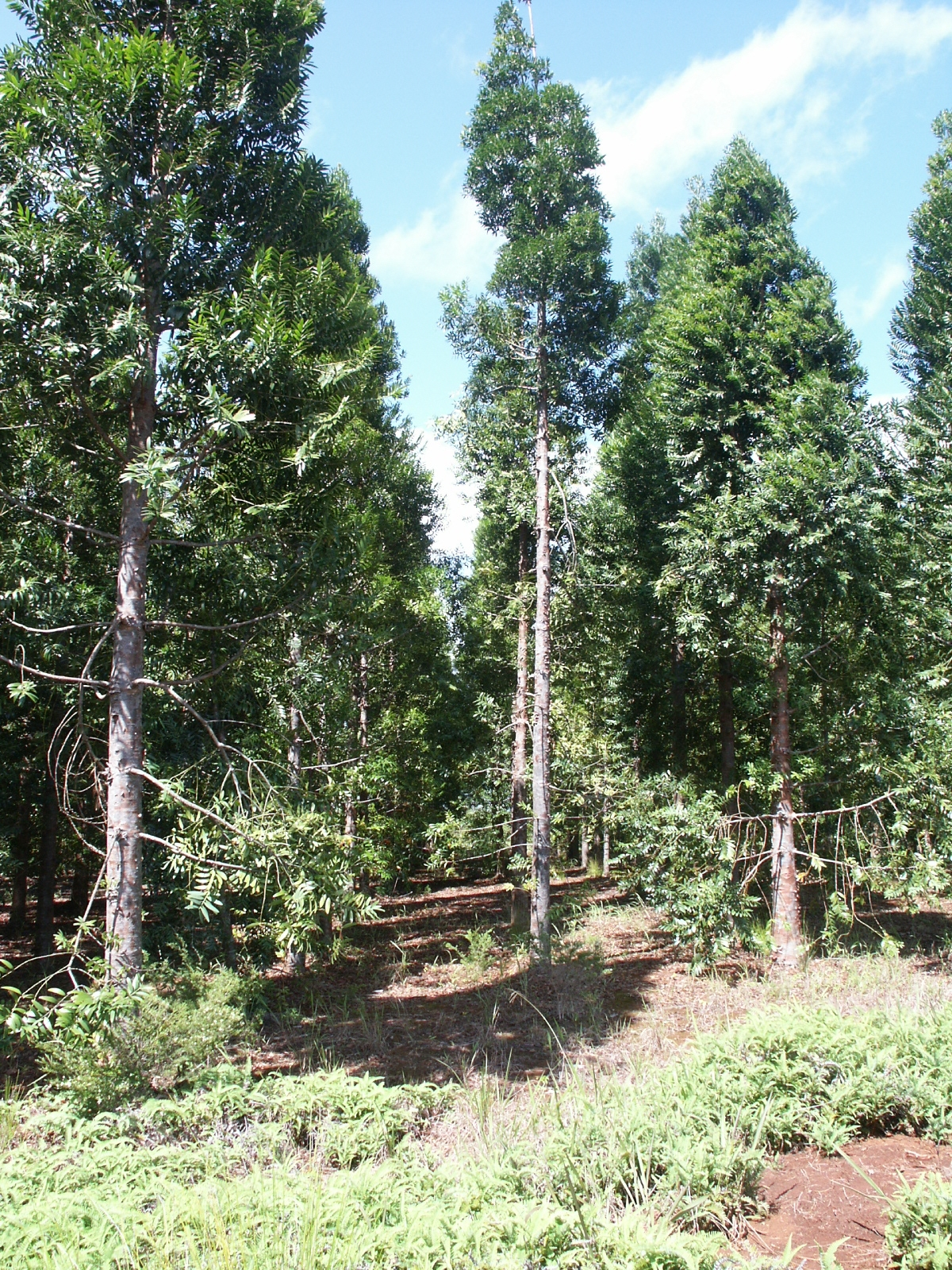
Agathis lanceolata

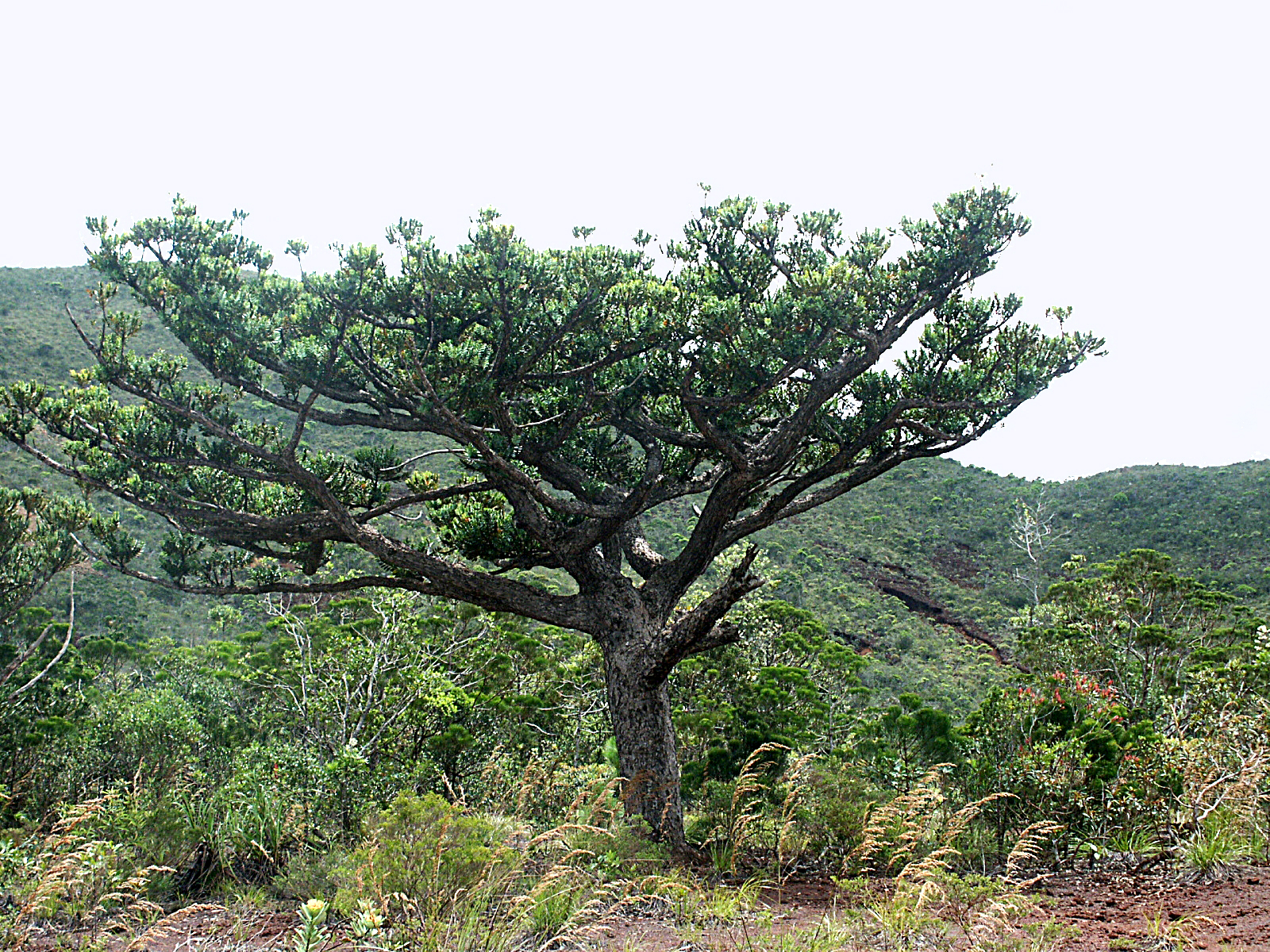
Agathis ovata

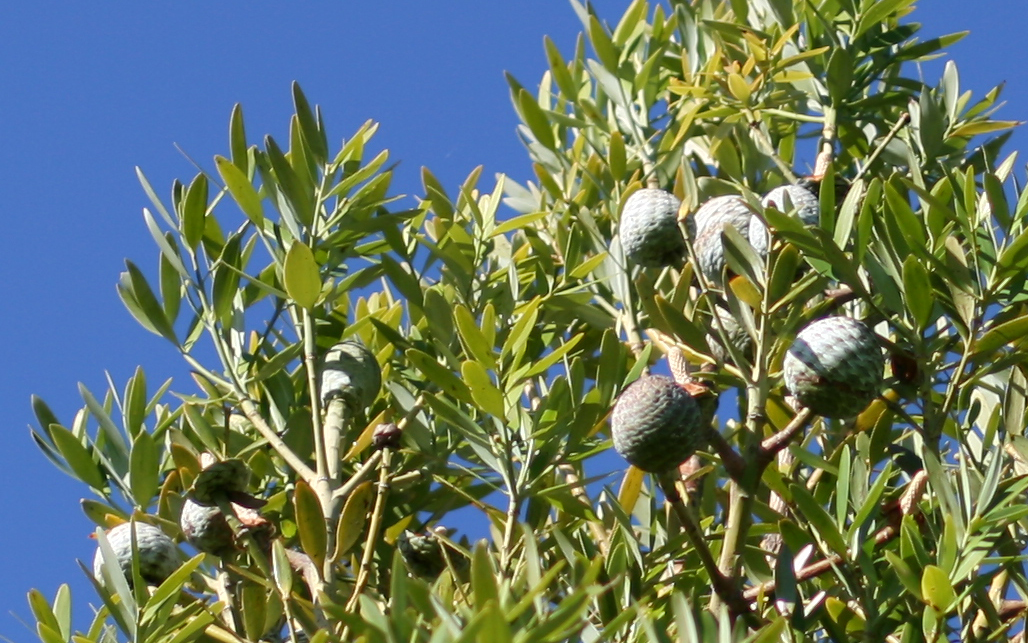
Agathis macrophylla

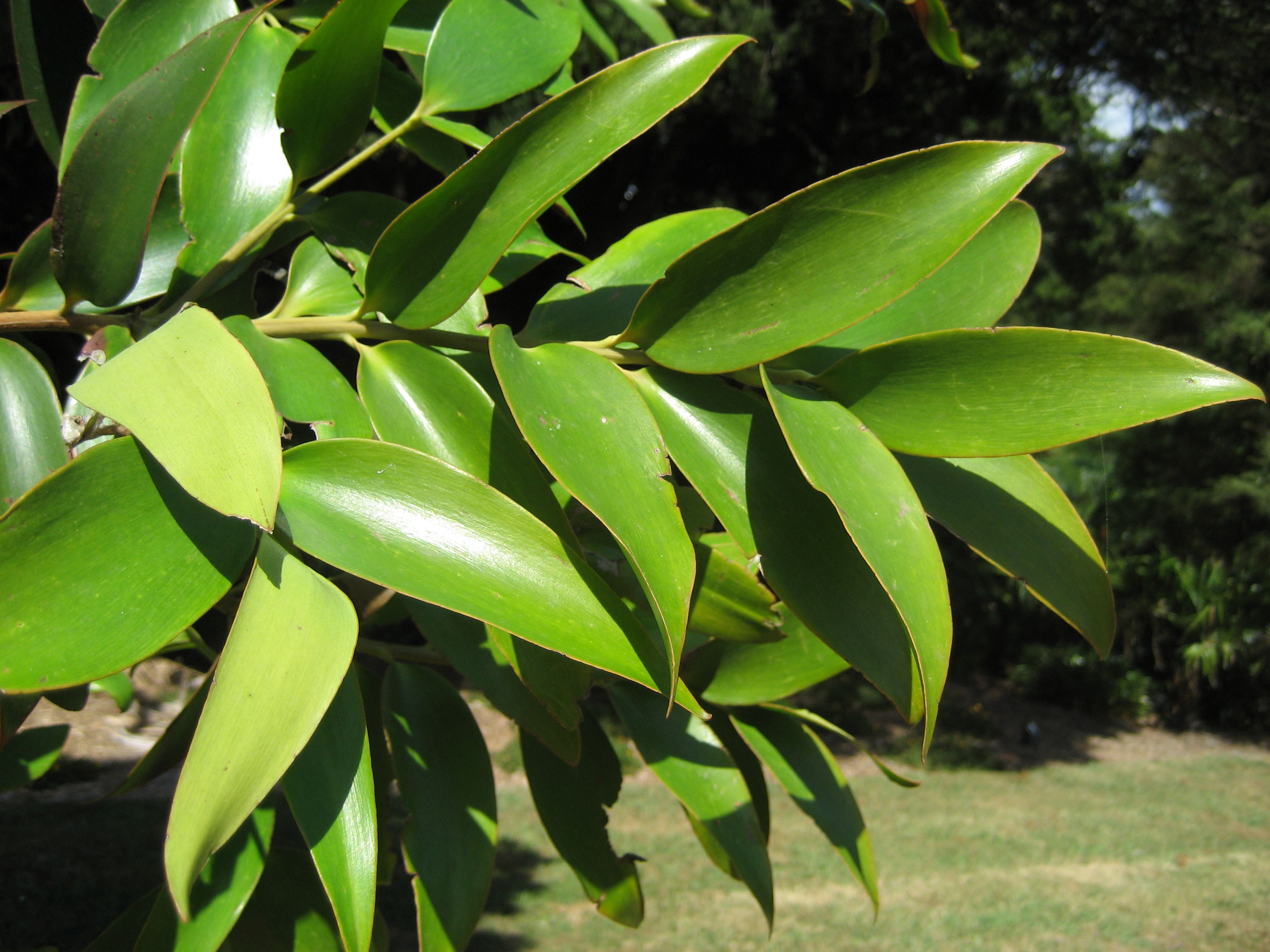
Agathis robusta

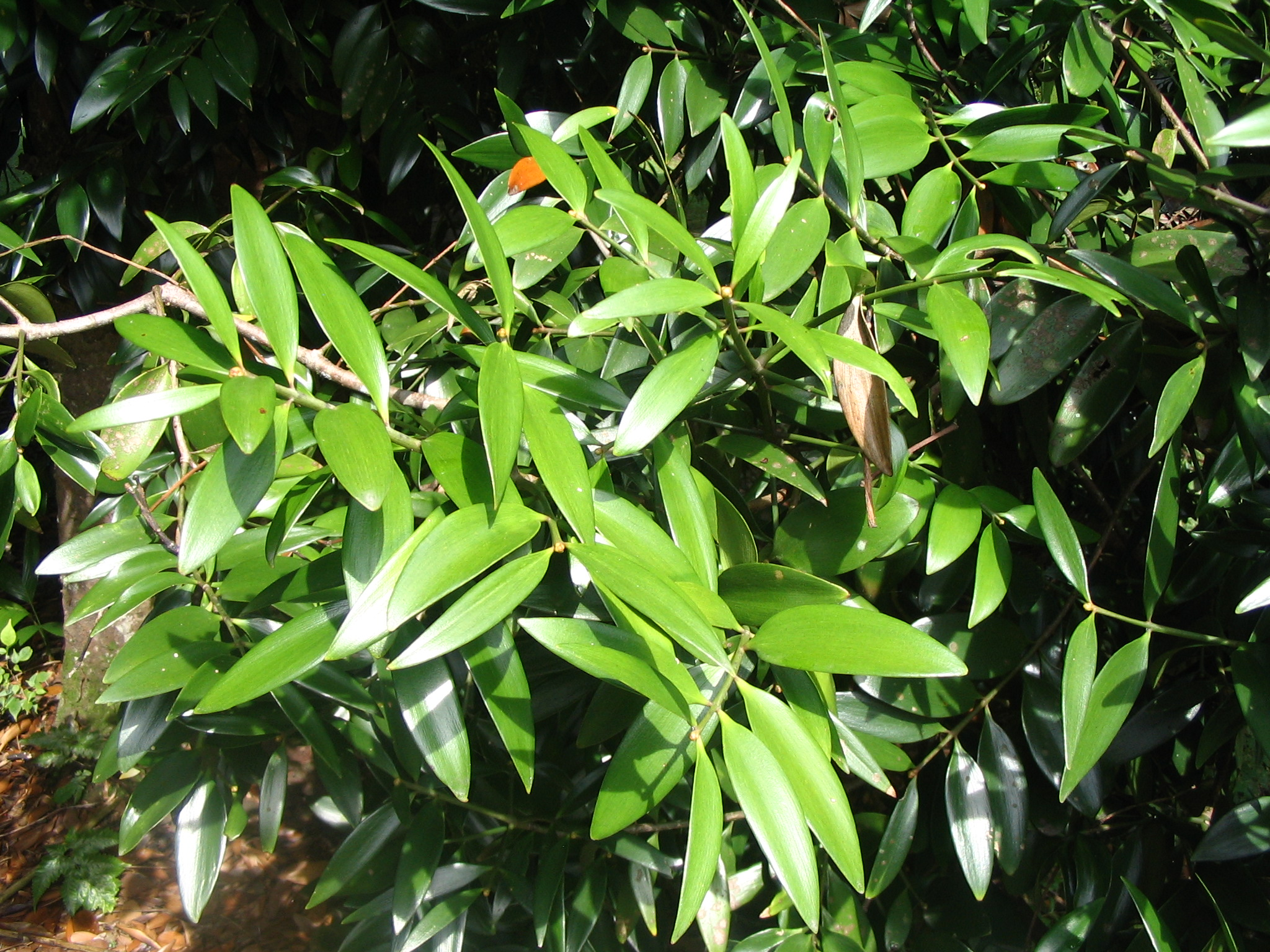
Agathis borneensis

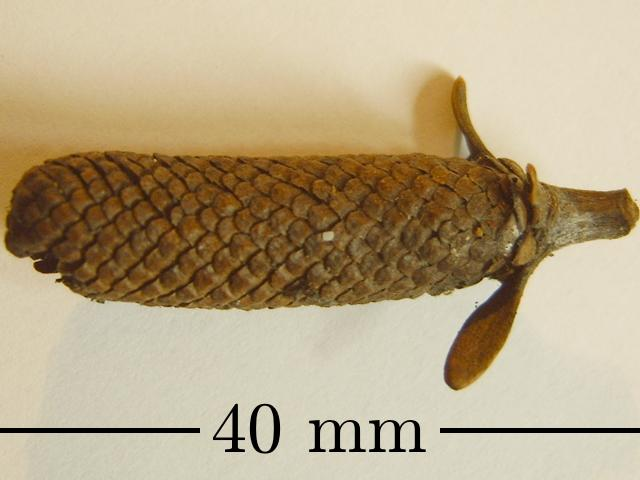
Agathis australis male pollen cone

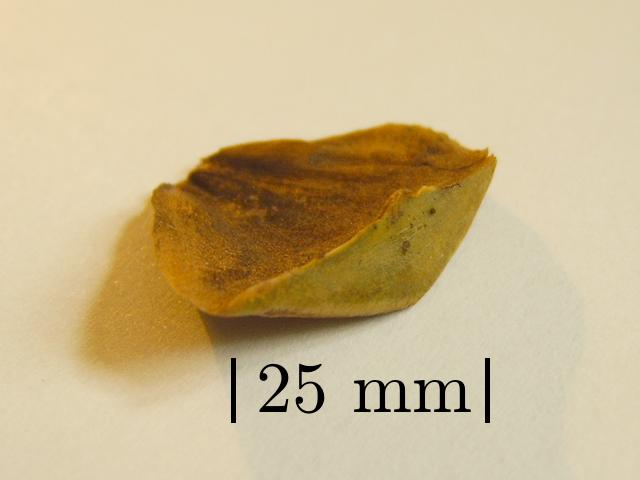
Scale from Agathis australis female cone

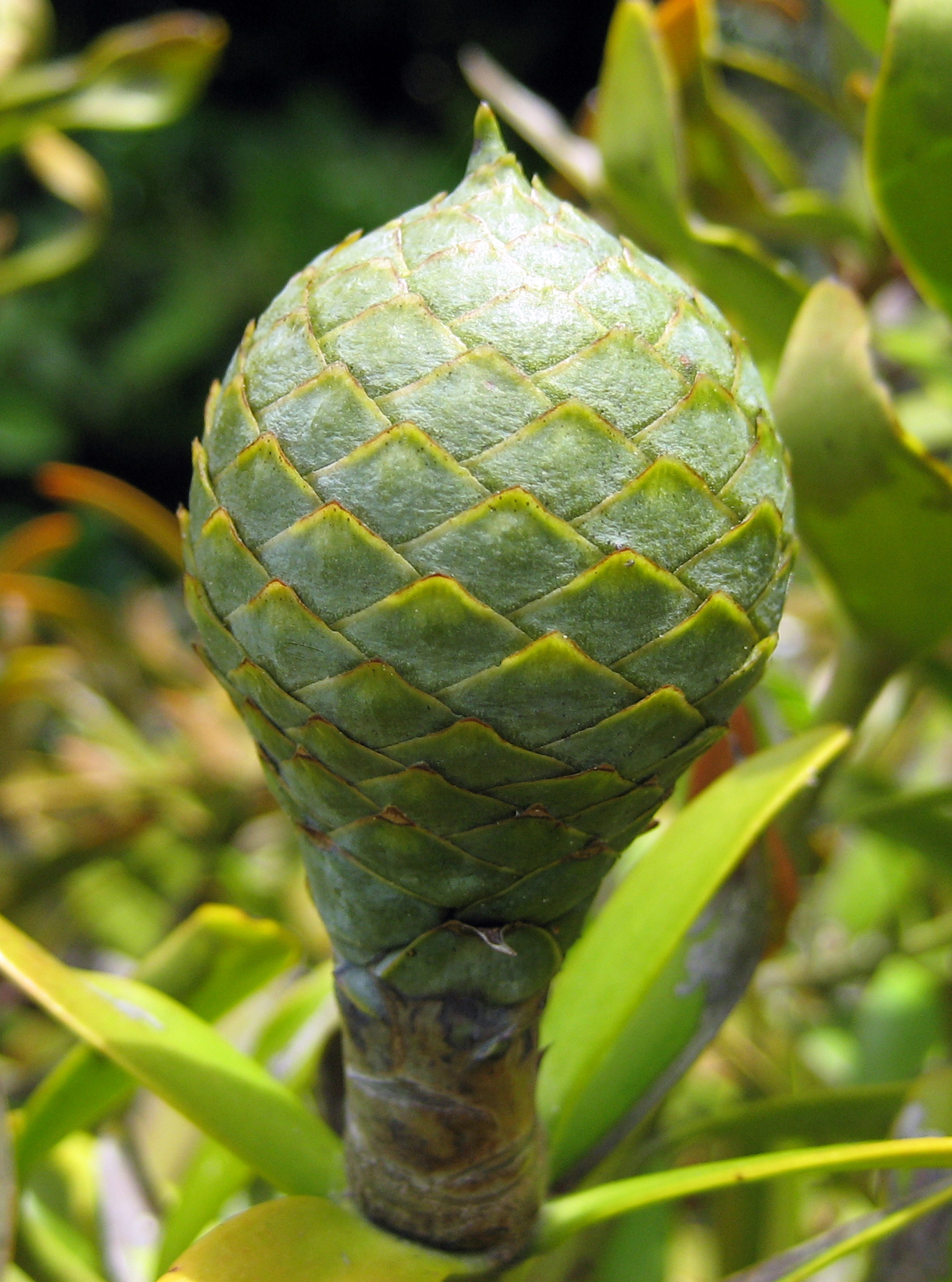
Agathis australis cone

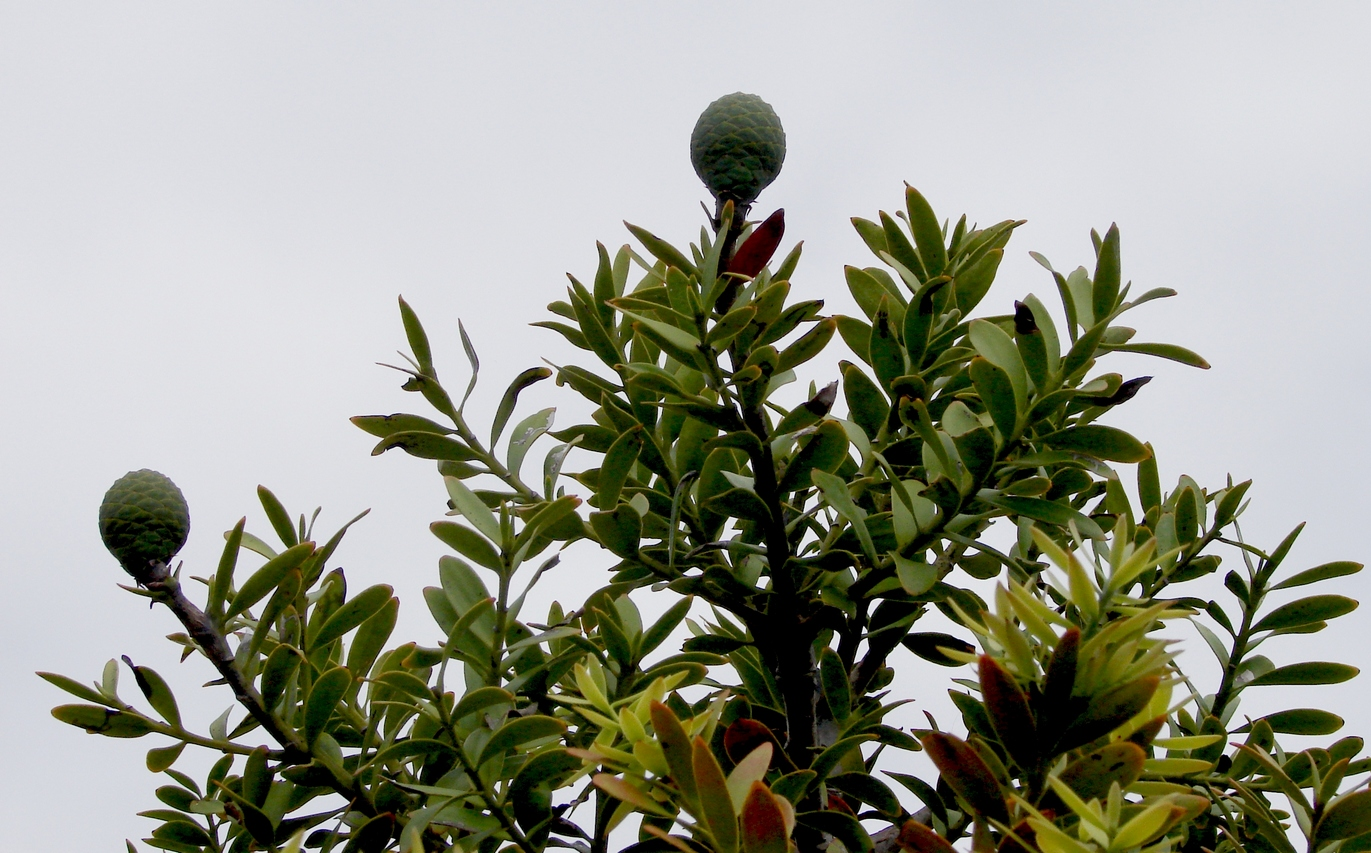
Agathis australis leaves and cones
