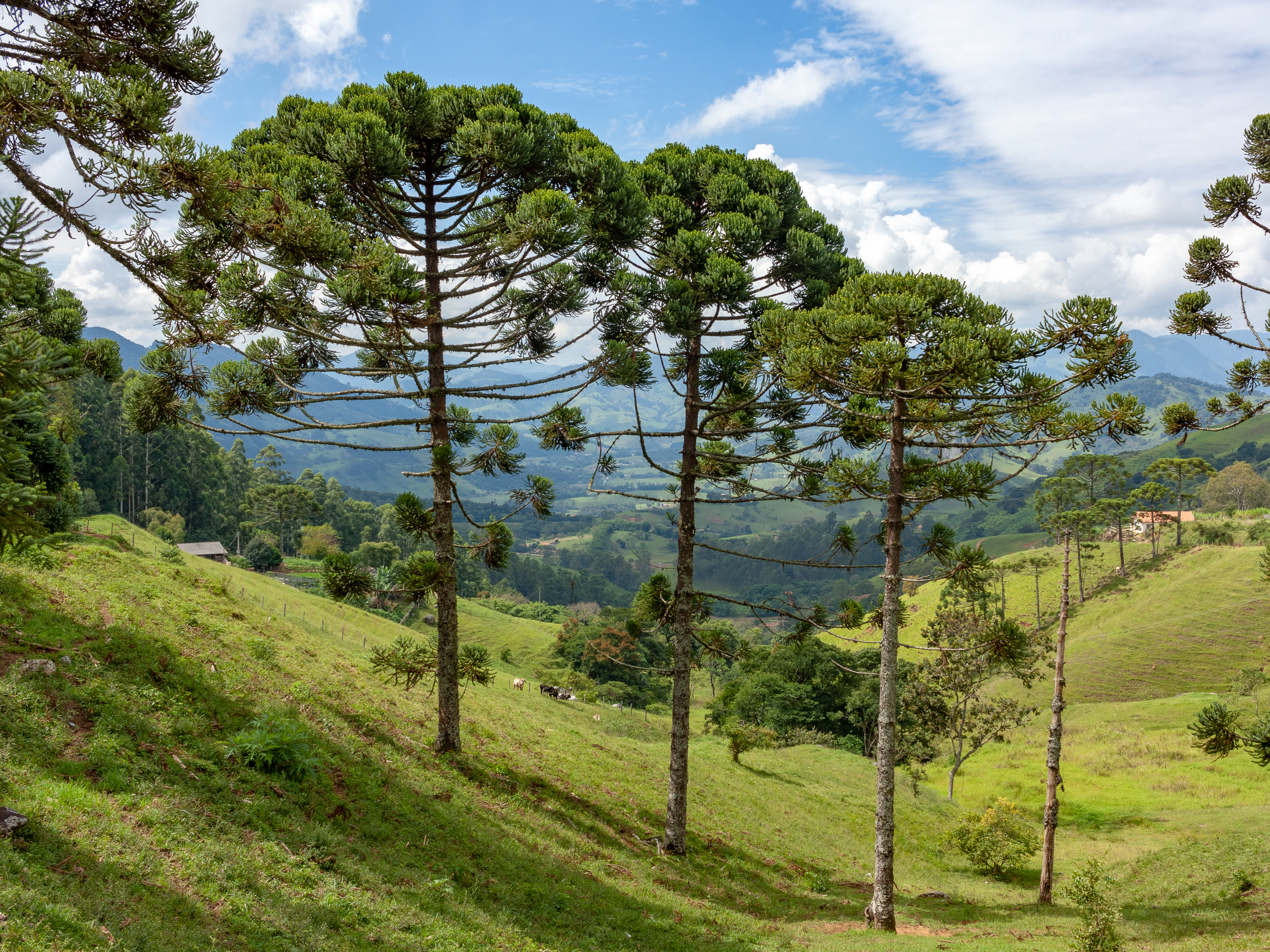
- Araucaria angustifolia at Minas Gerais

Scientific classification
- Kingdom: Plantae
- Clade: Tracheophytes
- Clade: Gymnosperms
- Division: Pinophyta
- Class: Pinopsida
- Order: Araucariales
- Family: Araucariaceae; Henkel & W. Hochstetter

Type genus
- Araucaria Juss.

Genera
- Agathis; Araucaria; Wollemia; †Agathoxylon (wood, in part); †Araucarioides (leaves, ovulate cone); †Araucarites (ovulate cone); †Brachyphyllum (foliage, in part); †Emwadea (ovulate cone); †Pagiophyllum (foliage, in part); †Wairarapaia (ovulate cone); †Dilwynites (pollen)

= Araucariaceae =

Araucariaceae Temporal range: Early Jurassic–Present (possible Late Triassic records)

Family of conifers

Araucariaceae is a family of conifers with three living genera, Araucaria, Agathis, and Wollemia. While the family's native distribution is now largely confined to the Southern Hemisphere, except for a few species of Agathis in Malesia, it was formerly widespread in the Northern Hemisphere during the Jurassic and Cretaceous periods.

== Description ==
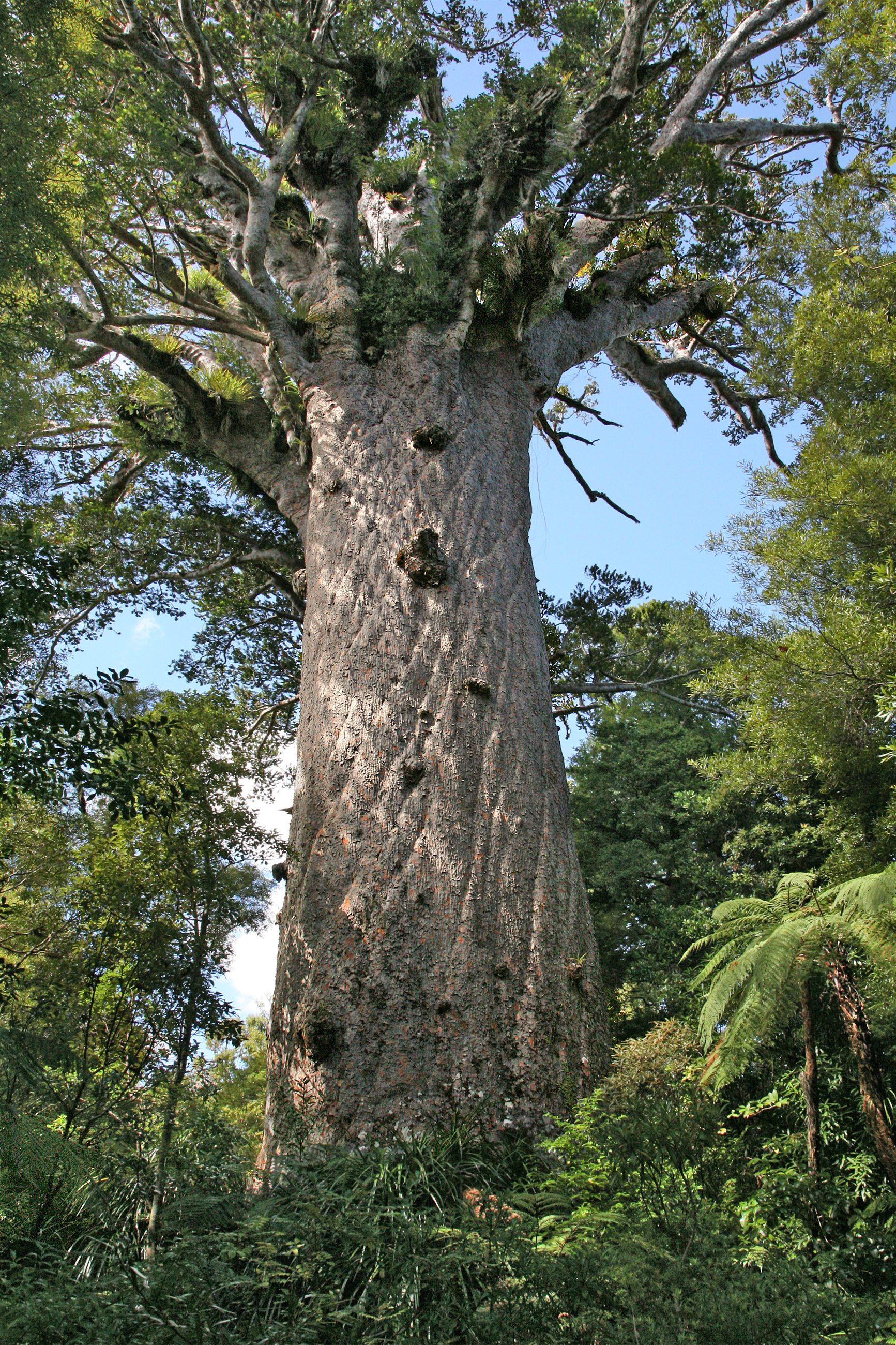
Tāne Mahuta ("Lord of the Forest"), a massive Agathis australis tree from New Zealand

Members of Araucariaceae are typically extremely tall trees, reaching heights of 60 m (200 ft) or more. They can also grow very large stem diameter. As an example of the family, the New Zealand kauri tree (Agathis australis) named Tāne Mahuta ("The Lord of the Forest") has been measured at 45.2 m (148 ft) tall with a diameter at breast height of 491 cm (16.11 ft). Its total wood volume is calculated to be 516.7 m^{3} (18,250 cu ft), making it the third-largest conifer after Sequoia and Sequoiadendron (both from the Cupressaceae subfamily Sequoioideae).

The trunks are columnar and have relatively large piths with resinous cortices. The branching is usually horizontal and tiered, arising regularly in whorls of three to seven branches or alternating in widely separated pairs.

The leaves can be small, needle-like, and curved, or they can be large, broadly ovate, and flattened. They are spirally arranged, persistent, and usually have parallel venation.

Like other conifers, they produce cones. Each tree can have both male and female cones (monoecious) or, more commonly, they can have only male or female cones (dioecious).

Male cones are among the largest among all conifer cones, on average. They are cylindrical and drooping, somewhat resembling catkins. They are borne singly on the tips of branches or in the axils of leaves. They contain numerous sporophylls arranged in whorls or spirals. Each has four to 20 elongated pollen sacs attached to the lower surface at one end. The pollen grains are round and do not possess wings or air sacs.

Female cones are also very large. They are spherical to ovoid in shape and borne erect on thick, short shoots at branch tips. The numerous bracts and scales are either fused to each other or separate for half of their lengths. The scales almost always bear only one seed on its upper surface, in contrast to two in true pines (family Pinaceae). They are very large, among the largest seeds among conifers. They are dispersed by wind, usually using wing-like structures. On maturity, the female cones detach and fall to the ground. Due to their size, they can cause serious injuries if they hit a person. As an example of the size of cones in this plant family, the cones of the bunya bunya, Araucaria bidwillii, weigh up to 10 kg (22 lb), about the size and weight of a large pineapple. They can drop from heights of 23 m (75 ft).

== Classification and genera ==
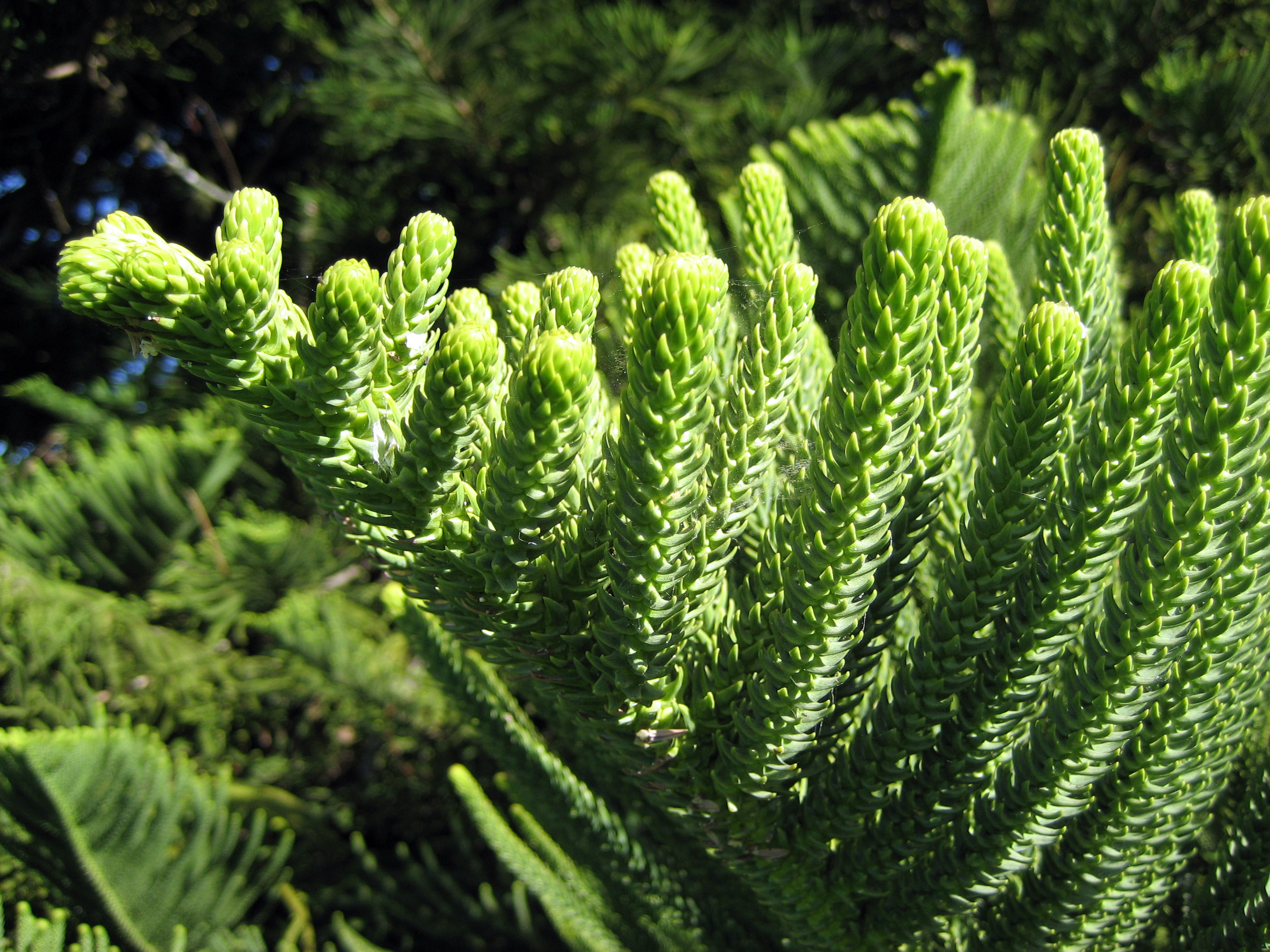
Araucaria heterophylla

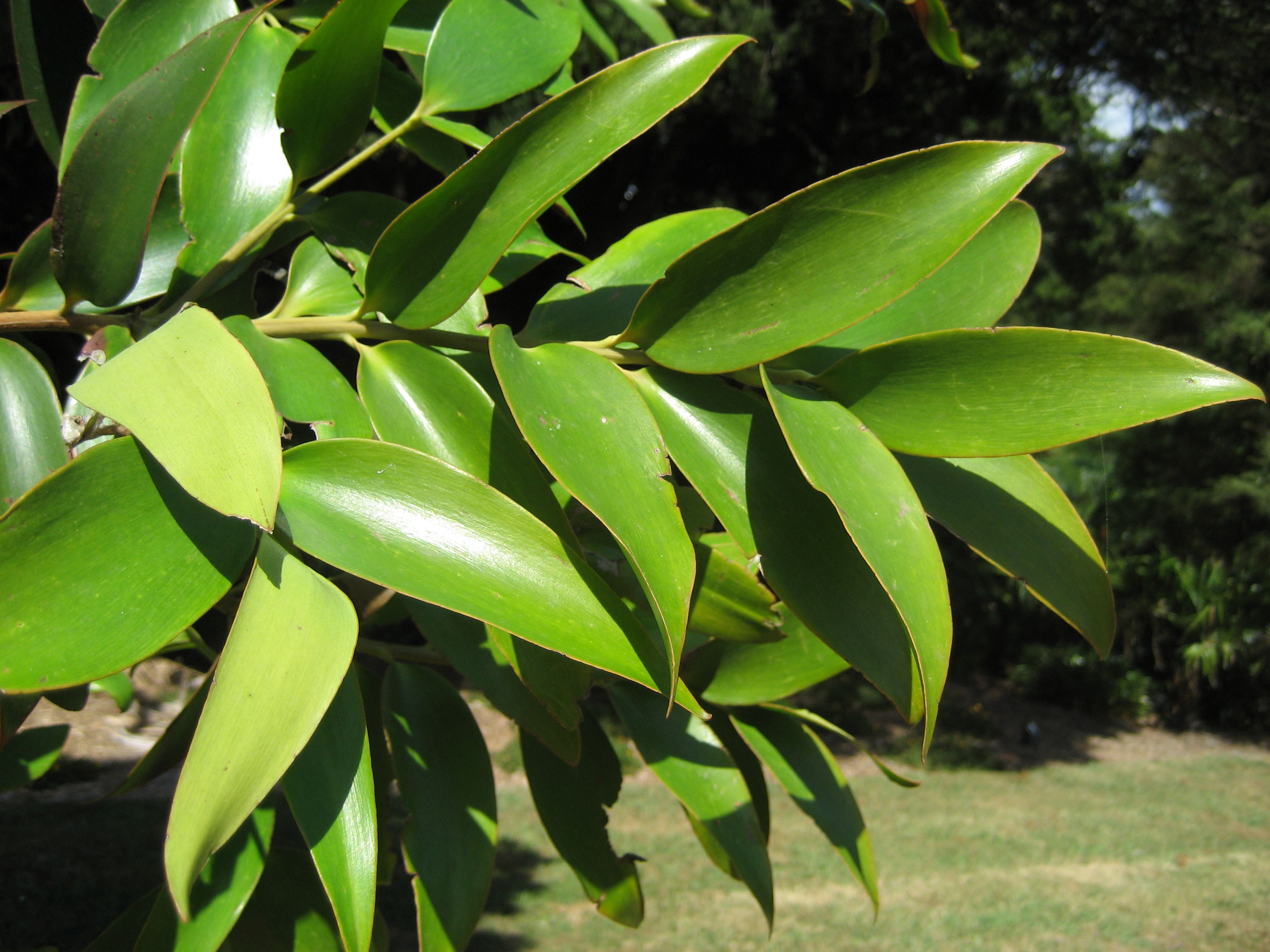
Agathis robusta

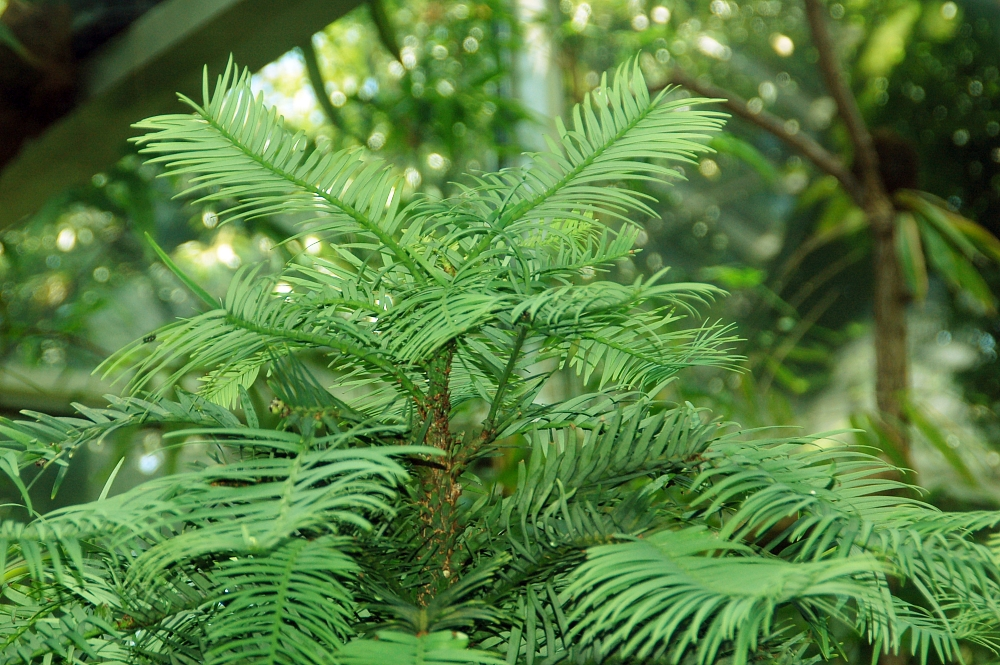
Wollemia nobilis

Araucariaceae is classified under the order Pinales, class Pinopsida of the division Pinophyta. The division includes all living conifers. Recently however, some authorities treat Araucariaceae as a separate order, Araucariales.

Araucariaceae contains three extant genera and about 41 species.

Image	Genus	Living Species	Distribution
	Araucaria Jussieu	Araucaria angustifolia – Paraná pine; Araucaria araucana – monkey-puzzle or pehuén; Araucaria bernieri; Araucaria bidwillii – bunya-bunya; Araucaria biramulata; Araucaria columnaris – Cook pine; Araucaria cunninghamii – Moreton Bay pine, hoop pine; Araucaria goroensis; Araucaria heterophylla – Norfolk Island pine; Araucaria humboldtensis; Araucaria hunsteinii – klinki; Araucaria laubenfelsii; Araucaria luxurians; Araucaria montana; Araucaria muelleri; Araucaria nemorosa; Araucaria rulei; Araucaria schmidii; Araucaria scopulorum; Araucaria subulata	20 living species found in New Caledonia (where 14 species are endemic), Norfolk Island, Australia, New Guinea, Argentina, Chile, and Brazil.
	Agathis Salisbury	Agathis atropurpurea – black kauri, blue kauri (Queensland, Australia); Agathis australis – kauri, New Zealand kauri (North Island, New Zealand); Agathis borneensis (western Malesia, Borneo); Agathis dammara (syn. A. alba, A. celebica, A. loranthifolia) – Bindang (eastern Malesia); Agathis flavescens (Peninsular Malaysia); Agathis kinabaluensis (Borneo); Agathis labillardierei (New Guinea); Agathis lanceolata (New Caledonia); Agathis lenticula (Borneo); Agathis macrophylla (syn. A. vitiensis) – Pacific kauri, dakua (Fiji, Vanuatu, Solomon Islands); Agathis microstachya – bull kauri (Queensland, Australia); Agathis montana (New Caledonia); Agathis moorei – white kauri (New Caledonia); Agathis orbicula (Borneo); Agathis ovata (New Caledonia); Agathis robusta – Queensland kauri (Queensland, Australia; New Guinea); Agathis silbae (Vanuatu)	New Zealand, Australia, Vanuatu, New Caledonia, Papua New Guinea, Indonesia, Malaysia, and the Philippines
	Wollemia W.G. Jones, K.D. Hill & J.M. Allen	Wollemia nobilis	Endemic to Australia. It was known only from fossil remains before the discovery of the living species in 1994.

== Phylogeny ==
Below is the phylogeny of the Pinophyta based on cladistic analysis of molecular data. It shows the position of Araucariaceae within the division.

- - Pinaceae
  - - - Araucariaceae
      - Podocarpaceae
    - - Sciadopityaceae
      - - Cupressaceae
        - - Cephalotaxaceae
          - Taxaceae

Relationships between living members of Araucariaceae.

- - Araucariaceae
    - Araucaria
    - - Wollemia
      - Agathis

Molecular evidence supports Araucariaceae and Podocarpaceae having diverged from each other during the late Permian.

== Distribution and habitat ==
Today, 41 species are known, in three genera: Agathis, Araucaria and Wollemia, distributed largely in the Southern Hemisphere.

By far the greatest diversity is in New Caledonia (18 species), with others in Australia, Argentina, New Zealand, Chile, southern Brazil, and Malesia. In Malesia, Agathis extends a short distance into the Northern Hemisphere, reaching 18°N in the Philippines.

== Uses ==
Several species are very popular ornamental trees in gardens in subtropical regions, and some are also very important timber trees, producing wood of high quality. Several have edible seeds similar to pine nuts, and others produce valuable resin and amber. In the forests where they occur, they are usually dominant trees, often the largest species in the forest; the largest is Araucaria hunsteinii, reported to 89 m (292 ft) tall in New Guinea, with several other species reaching 50–65 m (164–213 ft) tall. A. heterophylla, the Norfolk Island pine, is a well-known landscaping and house plant from this taxon.

Skillful artisans in the Erzurum Province, Turkey, have used fossilized wood of Araucariaceae for centuries to manufacture jewelry and decorative items. It is known as "Oltustone", the name deriving from the town of Oltu, where it is most commonly excavated. Despite the fact that this semiprecious gemstone is classified as "stone", wood anatomy reveals it was fossilized pieces of trunks of Araucariacea. Oltustone, also called ‘Black Amber’ is unique to Turkey. It is dull and black, but when polished, acquires an attractive black sheen.

== Fossil record ==
Fossils widely believed to belong to Araucariaceae include the form genera Araucarites (various), Agathoxylon and Araucarioxylon (wood), Brachyphyllum (leaves), Araucariacites and Dilwynites (pollen), and Protodammara (cones).

The oldest definitive records of Araucariaceae are from the Early Jurassic, though there are potential earlier Late Triassic records. Early representatives of Araucaria are widespread across both hemispheres by the Middle Jurassic, such as Araucaria mirabilis and Araucaria sphaerocarpa from the Middle Jurassic of Argentina and England respectively. The oldest records of the Wollemia-Agathis lineage from the Cretaceous, including Emwadea microcarpa from the Albian aged Winton Formation of Australia and Wairarapaia mildenhallii from the Albian-Cenomanian of New Zealand. The oldest fossils currently confidently assignable to Agathis are those of Agathis immortalis from the Salamanca Formation of Patagonia, which dates to the Paleocene, approximately 64.67–63.49 million years ago. Agathis-like leaves are also known from the slightly older Lefipán Formation of the same region, which date to the very end of the Cretaceous. Araucariaceae fossils are also known from the latest Oligocene or earliest Miocene of the southwesternmost tip of Africa. Claimed records of Agathis from the Eocene of Canada based on chemical analysis of amber are questionable.

== See also ==
- Paleobotany
- Te Matua Ngahere
