= New Caledonian Araucaria =

The main diversity among genus Araucaria is hosted in New Caledonia, where 14 species, all endemic, are described out of a total of 20 extant species. These New Caledonian species are mainly found as dispersed populations in open areas, where competition is less intense.

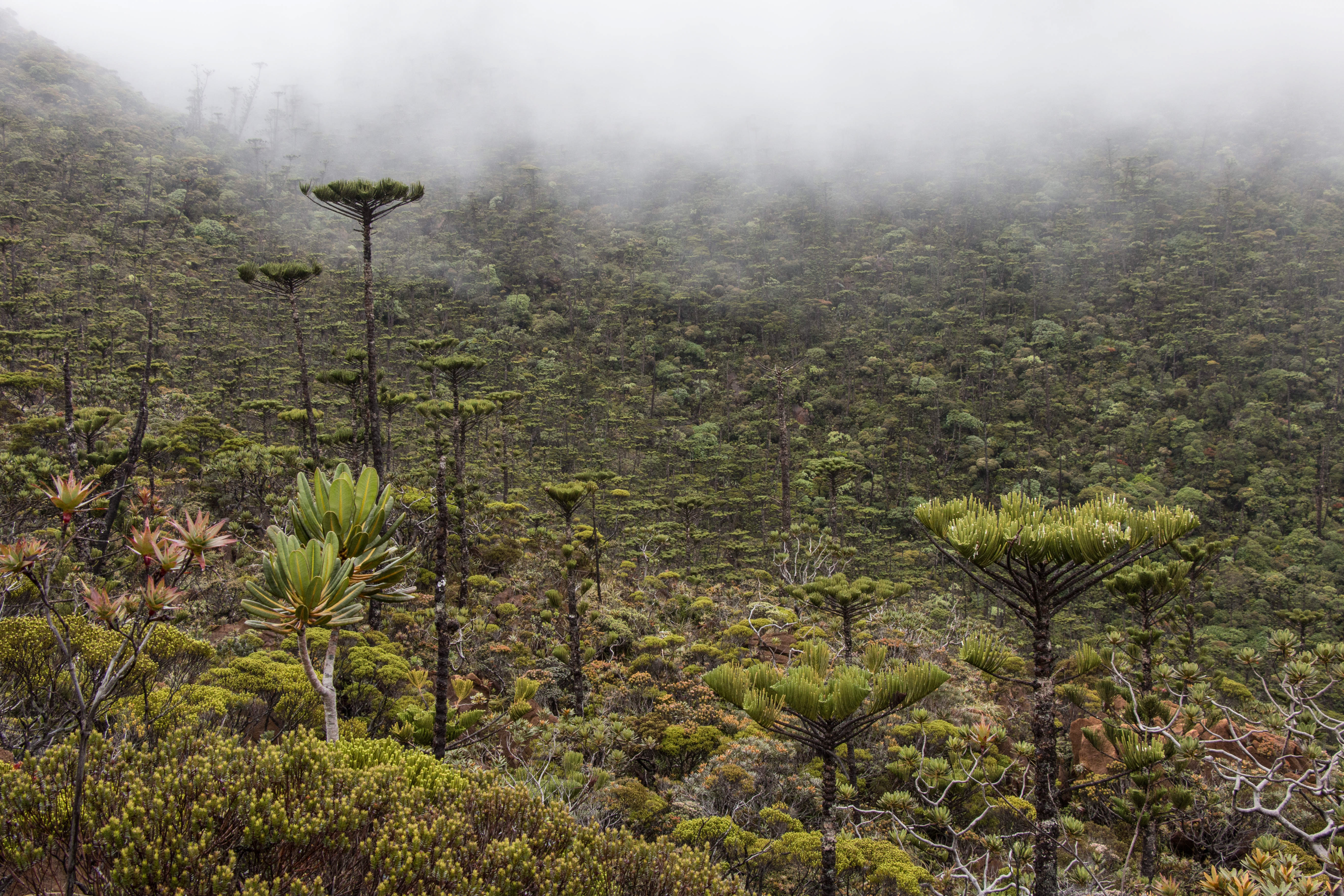
Araucaria humboldtensis growing in altitude shrubland, on the slopes of Mont Humboldt, New Caledonia

New Caledonia, considered as the smallest of the most significant biodiversity hotspots in the world, hosts a unique flora of which 75.1% is endemic. Species of Araucaria trees can be found in every habitat that New Caledonia possesses. However, almost all of them are growing on ultramafic substrate, characterized by low fertility (low N, P, K levels) and high levels of heavy metals (nickel, cobalt, etc.).

== Phylogenic history ==
=== Context ===
An alternative to the view that the island is a museum for plant relicts is the possibility that the diversity results from a recent radiation, subsequent to the island's emergence. New Caledonia was part of the supercontinent Gondwana, and separated from Australia 80 Ma. However, geological evidence suggests that New Caledonia was submerged during Paleocene (ca. 65 Ma) and Eocene (until ca. 37 Ma). The actual New Caledonian biota may then result from a total recolonization since the Oligocene.

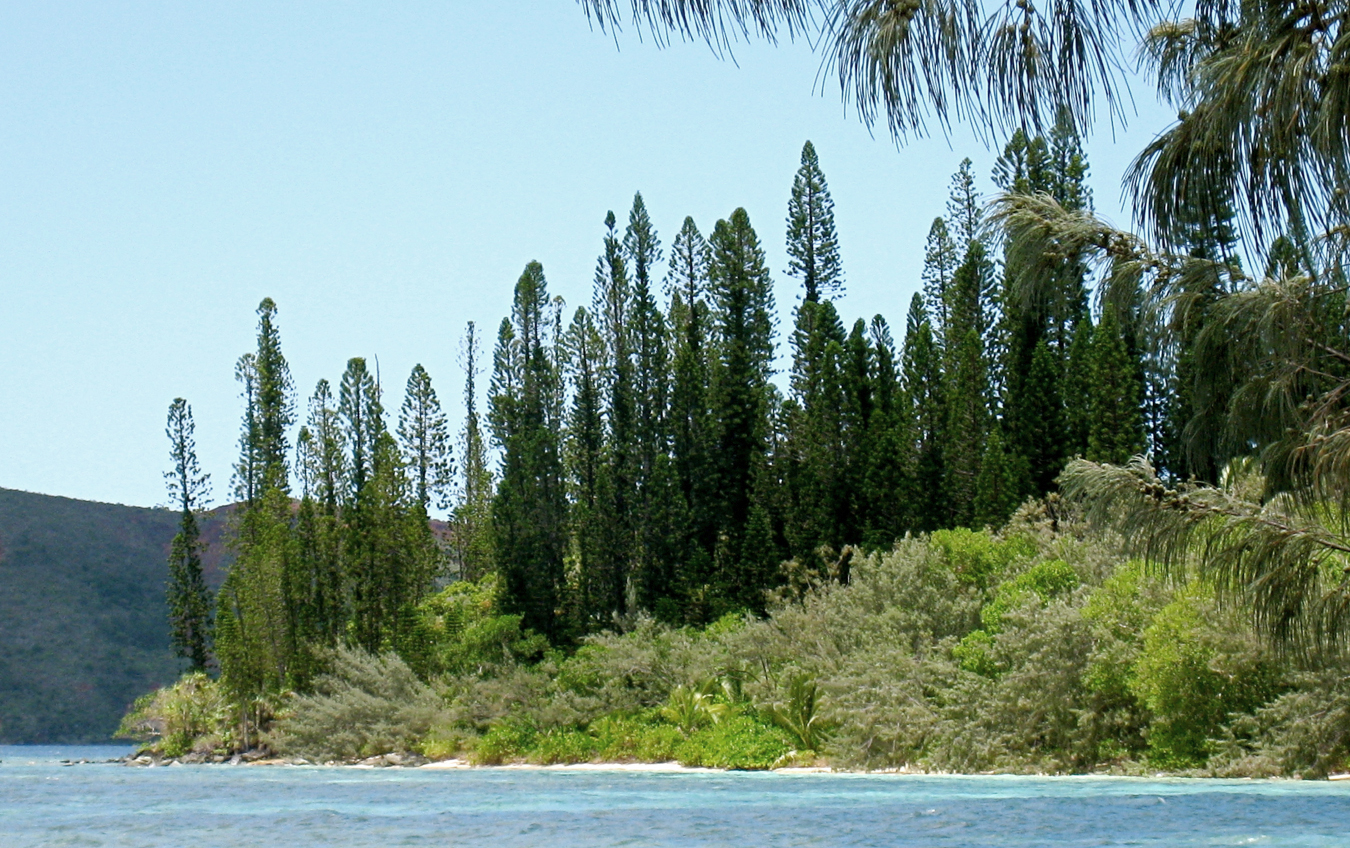
Araucaria columnaris growing on calcareous substrate, in the South of New Caledonia

The first Araucaria species were mentioned by Guillaumin in 1948: A. balansae, A. cookie, A. montana, A. muelleri and A. rulei. In 1949, J. T. Bucholz added three new species: A. bernieri, A. biramuluta and A. humboldtensis. In 1972, D. J. de Laubenfels described five other species: A. luxurians, separated from A. cookie renamed A. columnaris, A. laubenfelsii, A. nemorosa, A. scopulorum and A. schmidii, and divided these thirteen species in two groups. The first includes species following the Massart model (plagiotropic branches, partial reiterations) while the second includes species following the Rauh model (orthotropic branches and no reiterations) with bigger leaves. Veillon described how the morphology of New Caledonian Araucaria conforms to these models and noticed that species following the Rauh model have bigger leaves. He also designed a key to help in field identification, based on characters fixed in adults, so ecological factors impacting tree morphology won't interfere with identification.

New Caledonian Araucaria species belong to the Eutacta section, one of the four sections defined by Wilde and Eames in 1952. This section also includes A. heterophylla from Norfolk Island, and A. cunninghamii hosted by both Australia and New Guinea.

=== Rejection of the Gondwanan hypothesis ===
In 1998, first genetic analyses based on RBCL gene sequence validated the recognition of the four sections within genus Araucaria. Among Eutacta section, New Caledonian species formed a monophyletic group where A. cunninghamii (Papua New Guinea) was derived first, then A. heterophylla (Norfolk Island). The New Caledonian species revealed a strong homology for rcbL sequences (from 99.5 to 100%), where 10 out of 13 species are identical for this gene sequence. This strong homology and A. heterophylla as a sister group of New Caledonian species (the Norfolk Island being relatively young, less than 3 million years old) are first elements suggesting a recent differentiation of Araucaria trees in New Caledonia. This hypothesis comes in opposition of an older Gondwanan origin.

Gaudeul et al. attempted in 2012 to better describe the evolutionary relationships and diversification of New Caledonian species by using AFLP markers and by performing Bayesian, genetic distances and cladistics analyses. Ecological, morphological and geographical parameters were also considered in the study, which ended supporting a recent diversification of the genus in New Caledonia. Moreover, another genetic group was created: coastal species. However, no evidence were shown for more environment implication in driving speciation, which may be the result of both adaptation and allopatry. The concept of cryptic species, rare among such an iconic group, is mentioned, regarding several divergent populations.

In the meantime, Escapa and Catalano published a phylogenetic analysis using parsimony. For the first time in the family Araucariaceae, genetic (19 plastid, 2 nuclear and 2 mitochondrial genomic regions) and morphologic data (52 discrete and 10 continuous characters) were combined, confirming a strong monophyly for the 4 sections existing. However, relationships among New Caledonian species remain difficult to elucidate even if their relatively recent origin is confirmed by phylogeny based on combination of plastid and nuclear data, and the use of molecular clock. While this study seems to corroborate with overwater dispersal consecutively to the submersion of New Caledonia, New Caledonian Araucaria species seems too old to originate from one single dispersal from Australia to Norfolk Island, and then to New Caledonia.

=== Cryptic diversity ===
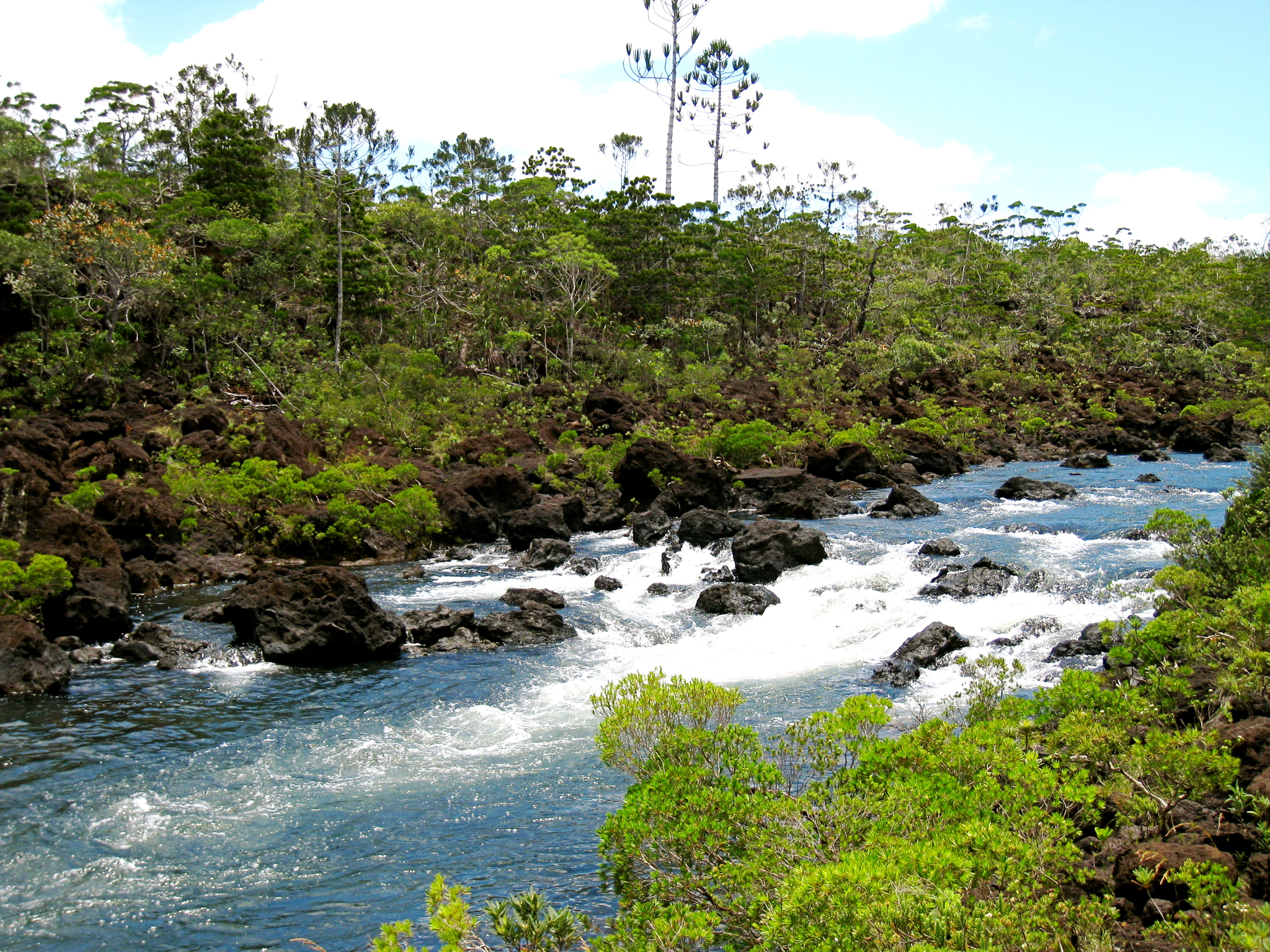
Araucaria muelleri population, Yaté, New Caledonia

The complexity of species identification and delimitation in New Caledonian Araucaria is illustrated by Rusham et al. (2016), underlying a cryptic diversity present between two relative species (A. rulei and A. muelleri). This work leads to the identification of a fourteenth endemic species, Araucaria goroensis, confirming the difficulty to distinguish species among the Monkey Puzzle genus in the territory. This new species was initially confused with A. muelleri, but it appears to be more closely related to A. rulei. Distinctions with the latter hold in larger leaves, microsporophylls without a shouldered base and shorter female cone bracts.

The origin of such a diversity among the genus Araucaria in New Caledonia still remain unclear, but appears to be relatively recent. Also speciation may be still be processed as suggested by the cryptic diversity observed among the genus.

Group	Species	IUCN status	Leaf length (mm)	Leaf width (mm)	Architectural model	Substrate	Habitat	Altitude (m)
Coastal	A. columnaris	LC	5-7	4-5	Massart	Calcareous	Calcareous platforms	< 50
	A. nemorosa	CR	6-10	1.5-3	Massart	Ultramafic	Maquis	< 100
	A. luxurians	EN	5-7	4-5	Massart	Ultramafic	Humid evergreen forest	< 300
Small-leaved	A. bernieri	VU	2-3.5	1.5-2.5	Massart	Ultramafic	Humid evergreen forest, deep valleys	100 - 800
	A. schmidii	VU	7-10	1.5-2	Massart	Acidic	Montane cloud forest	> 1400
	A. scopulorum	EN	3-4	2.5-3	Massart	Ultramafic	Maquis	50 - 800
	A. subulata	NT	4-6	2-2.5	Massart	Ultramafic	Humid evergreen forest, deep valleys	100 - 1100
Large-leaved	A. biramulata	VU	7-9	5-6	Massart	Ultramafic	Humid evergreen forest, deep valleys	300 - 1000
	A. goroensis	EN	26-33	1-16	Rauh	Ultramafic	Maquis	150 - 550
	A. humboldtensis	EN	5-6	4-5	Massart	Ultramafic	Maquis of high altitude	600 - 1500
	A. laubenfelsii	NT	12-20	8-10	Massart	Ultramafic	Evergreen forest or maquis	700 - 1200
	A. montana	VU	11-14	7-8	Massart	Ultramafic and acidic	Dense humid forest or maquis	400 - 1200
	A. muelleri	EN	30-35	15-20	Rauh	Ultramafic	Dense humid forest or maquis	150 - 1200
	A. rulei	EN	20-25	11-14	Rauh	Ultramafic	Dense humid forest or maquis	400 - 800
