= Araucaria grandifolia =

Araucaria grandifolia Temporal range: Early Cretaceous (Albian), 113.2–100.5 Ma

Scientific classification
- Kingdom: Plantae
- Clade: Tracheophytes
- Clade: Gymnospermae
- Division: Pinophyta
- Class: Pinopsida
- Order: Araucariales
- Family: Araucariaceae
- Genus: Araucaria
- Species: †A. grandifolia

Binomial name
- †Araucaria grandifolia (G. M. Del Fueyo and A. Archangelsky) (2002)

Extinct species of conifer

Araucaria grandifolia is a species of conifer in the genus Araucaria. It lived during the Albian stage of the Early Cretaceous. Fossils are found in the Punta del Barco Formation. It went extinct at the end of the Early Cretaceous.

== Description ==
Araucaria grandifolia is diagnosed from fossil remains based on distinct features of its shoots and leaves. The shoots show preserved secondary xylem (wood tissue), with rays that are made of one type of cell (homocellular) and arranged in single rows (uniseriate). The pits in the cross-fields (areas where wood cells connect) are of the cupressoid type, a feature common in conifers. The leaves are large, many-veined, and shaped like narrow triangles with pointed tips and bases that extend down the stem (decurrent). They have smooth edges and a strong central ridge on the lower surface. The leaves are tightly packed, overlapping (imbricate), and arranged in a spiral pattern. Both the upper and lower leaf surfaces have stomata (pores for gas exchange), which are organized in straight rows and aligned along the length of the leaf. The stomata are elliptical and surrounded by four helper cells—two on the sides and two at the ends. The guard cells that control the pores are kidney-shaped and set deep within the surface. The leaf surface also has two types of outer skin (epidermal) cells: polygonal ones along the stomatal rows and long, rectangular ones between them. Beneath this outer layer is a supportive layer of fibrous cells. Under the microscope, the waxy coating of the leaf (cuticle) shows bands of both straight and wavy fibers mixed with less-structured material. The top part of the cuticle also contains a layered (lamellate) structure, which helps in identifying this species.

== Environment ==
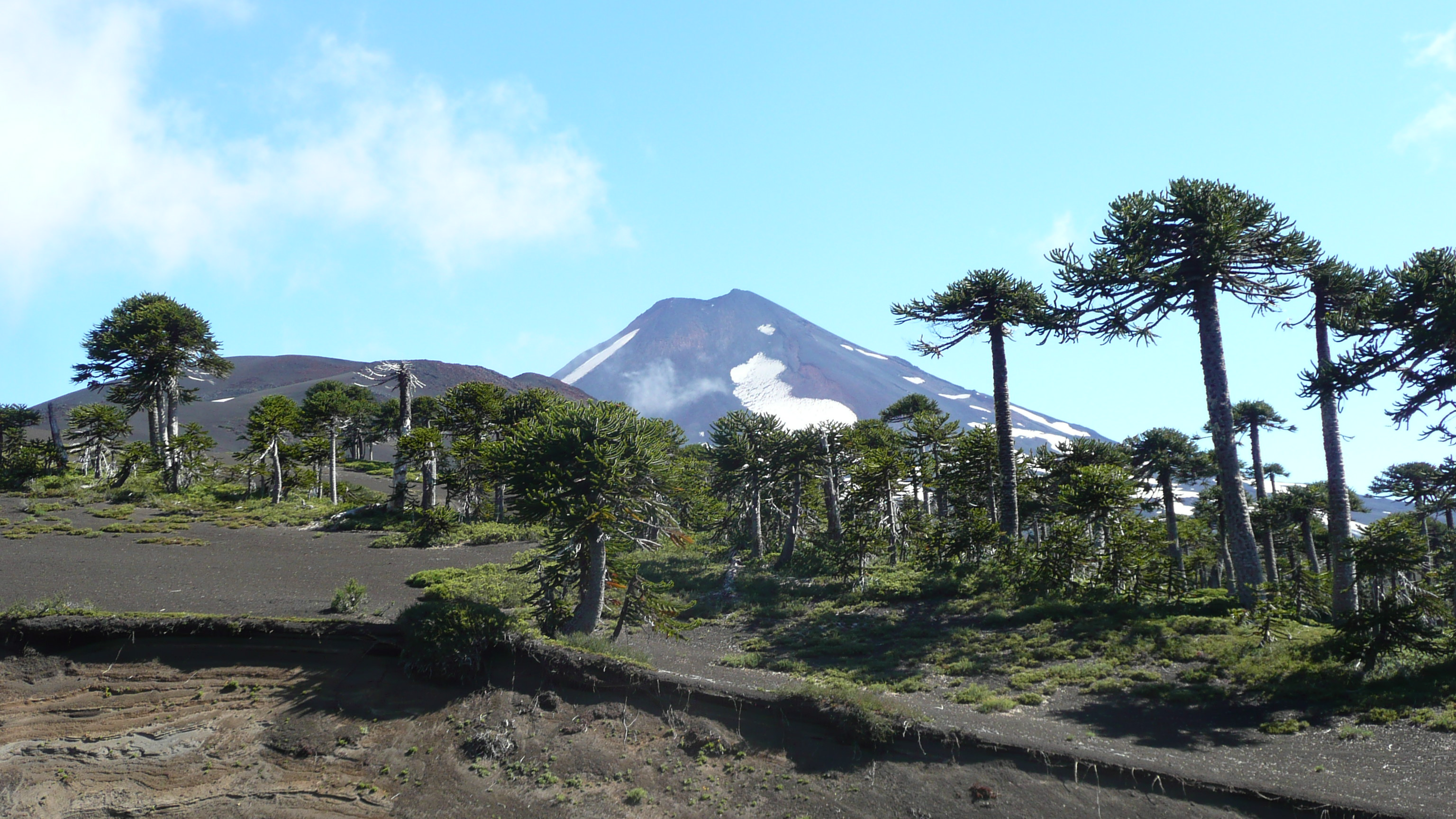
Araucaria araucana, a living relative of Araucaria grandifolia, seen here growing in volcanic soil—similar to the ancient environment where its extinct cousin once thrived PN Conguillio

A.grandifolia lived in temperate climate which was humid and warm. It grew near a river valley in volcanic soil due to the recurrent volcanic activity in the area.

== See also ==
- Paleobotany
- Araucaria mirabilis
- Araucaria haastii
