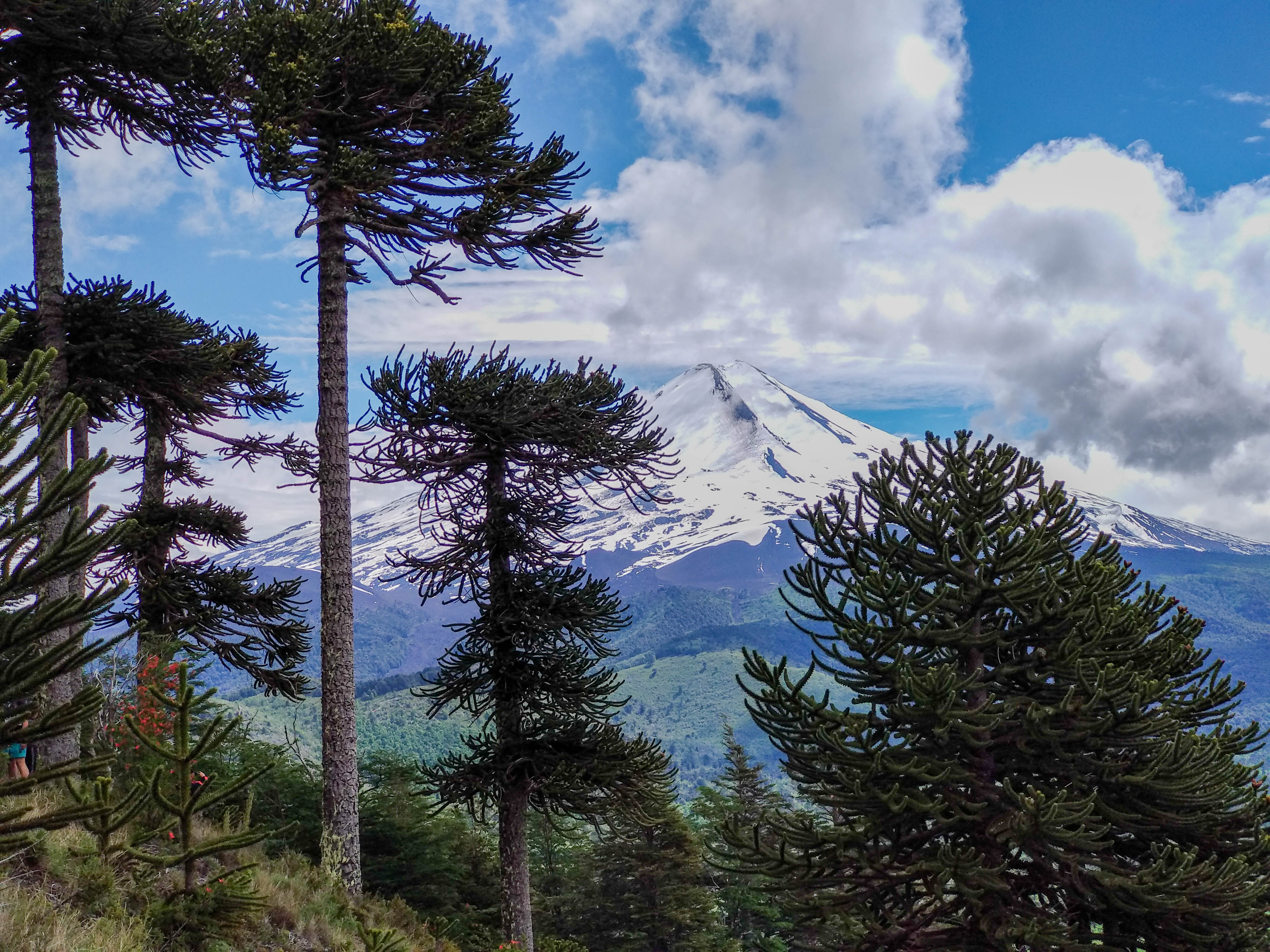
- Araucaria araucana in Conguillío National Park, Southern Chile

Scientific classification
- Kingdom: Plantae
- Clade: Tracheophytes
- Clade: Gymnosperms
- Division: Pinophyta
- Class: Pinopsida
- Order: Araucariales
- Family: Araucariaceae
- Genus: Araucaria; Juss.

Type species
- Araucaria araucana Pav.

Synonyms
- Altingia Don 1830 non Noronha 1785; Dombeya De Lamarck 1786 non L'Héritier de Brutelle 1785; Columbea Salisbury 1807 nom. ill.; Eutassa Salisbury 1807 non Broun 1909; Eutacta Link 1842; Quadrifaria Manetti ex Gordon 1862; Marywildea Bobrov & Melikian 2006; Titanodendron Bobrov & Melikian 2006

= Araucaria =

Araucaria Temporal range: Middle Jurassic–Recent

Genus of evergreen conifers

Araucaria ( /ærɔːˈkɛəriə/; original pronunciation: [a.ɾawˈka. ɾja]) is a genus of evergreen coniferous trees in the family Araucariaceae. While today they are largely confined to the Southern Hemisphere, during the Jurassic and Cretaceous they were globally distributed. There are 20 extant species in New Caledonia (where 14 species are endemic, see New Caledonian Araucaria), eastern Australia (including Norfolk Island), New Guinea, Argentina, Brazil, Chile and Uruguay.

The genus is familiar to many people as the genus of the distinctive Chilean pine or monkey-puzzle tree (Araucaria araucana). No distinct vernacular name exists for the genus. Many are called "pine", such as the "Norfolk pine" (Araucaria heterophylla) although they are only distantly related to true pines, in the genus Pinus.

== Description ==
Araucaria are mainly large trees with a massive erect stem, reaching a height of 5–80 metres (16–262 ft). The horizontal, spreading branches grow in whorls and are covered with leathery or needle-like leaves. In some species, the leaves are narrow, awl-shaped, and lanceolate, barely overlapping each other; in others, they are broad and flat, and overlap broadly.

The two South American species A. angustifolia and A. araucana are mostly dioecious, with male and female cones found on separate trees. The other species in the genus are monoecious. The female cones, on the top of the tree, are globose, and vary in size among species from 7 to 25 centimetres (3 to 10 in) in diameter. They contain 80–200 large edible seeds, similar to pine nuts, though larger. The male cones are smaller, 4–10 cm (1 1/2–4 in) long, narrow to broad cylindrical, and 1.5–5 cm (1/2–2 in) broad.

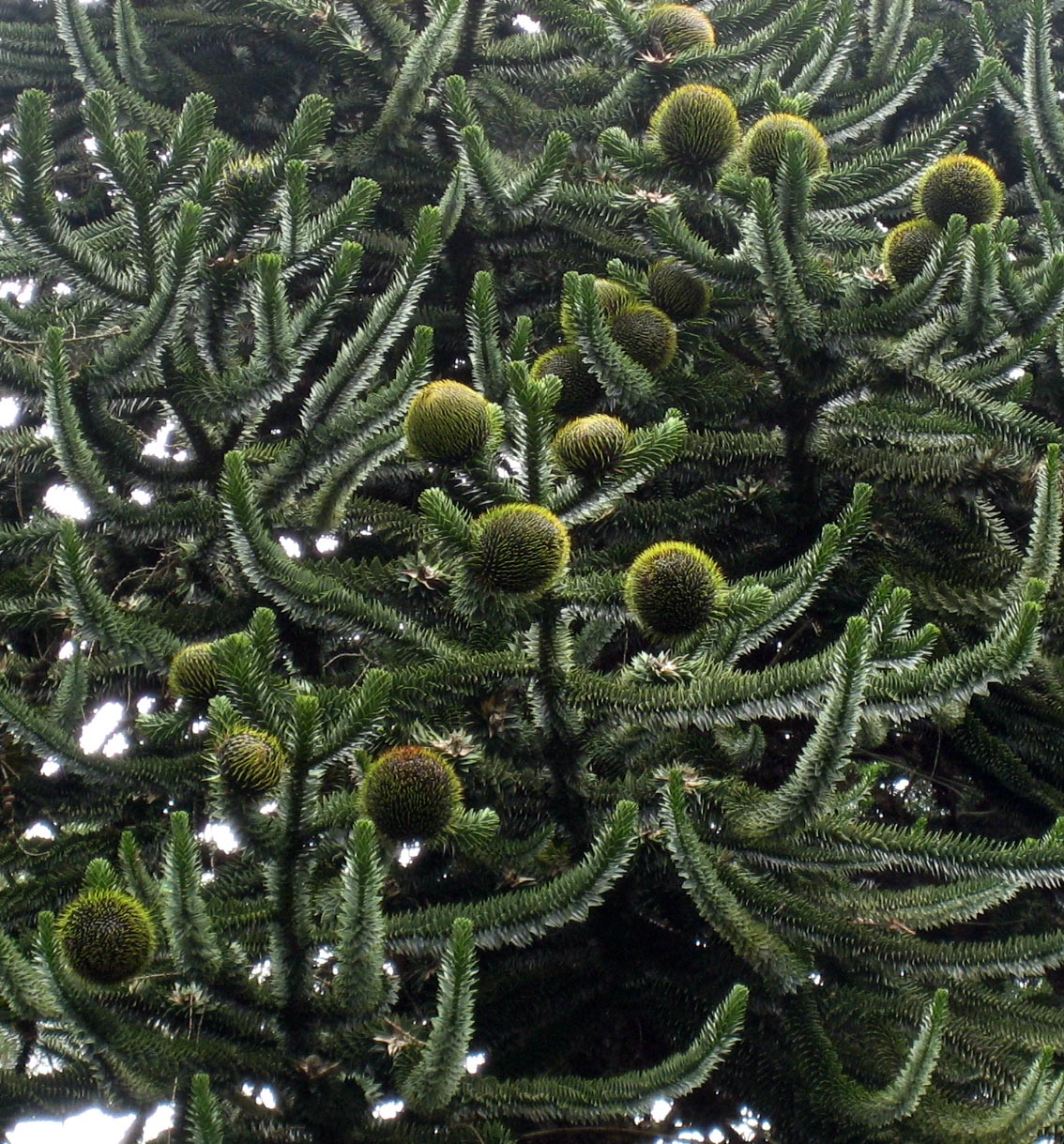
A. araucana with seed cones

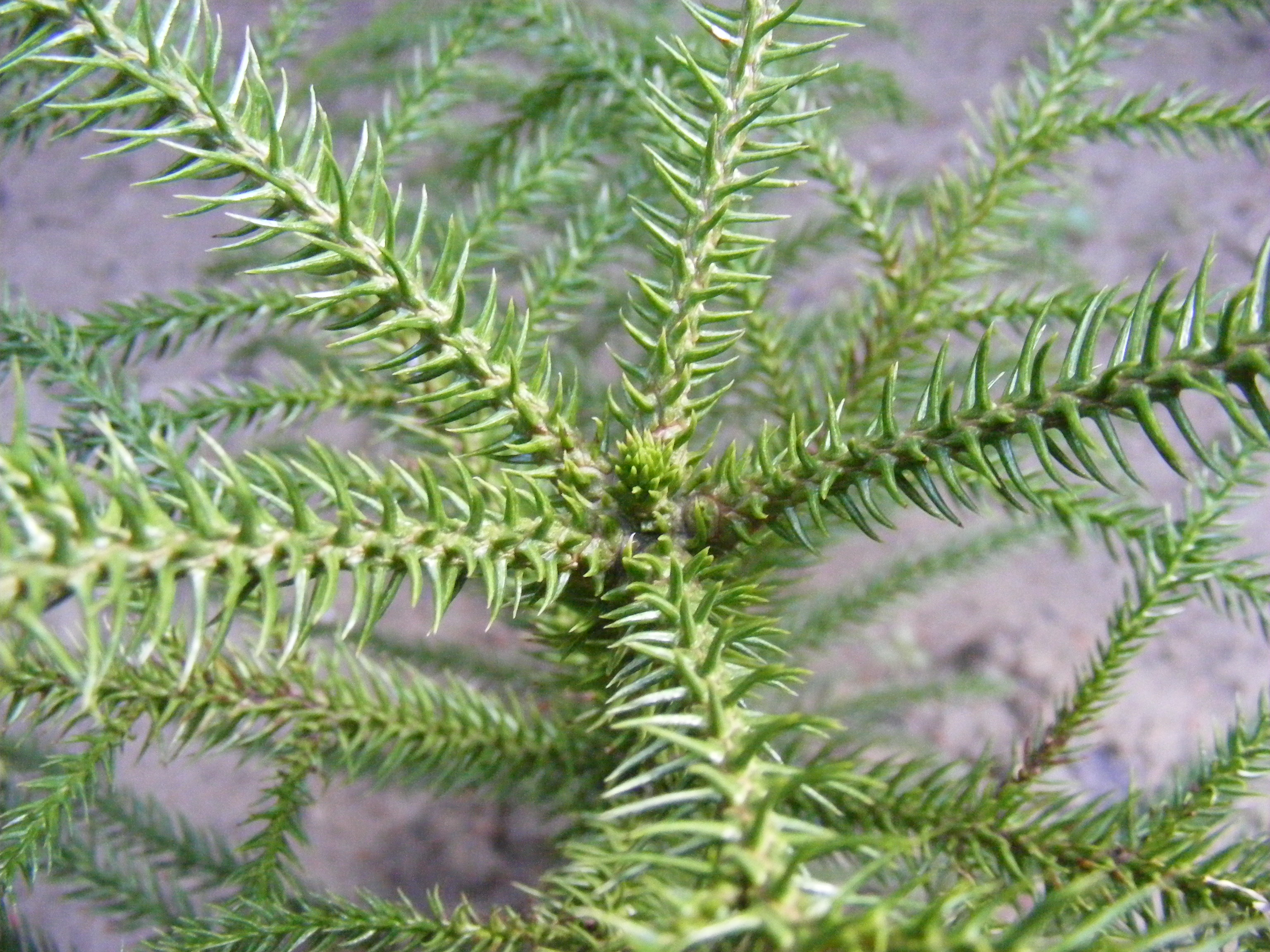
A. columnaris sapling with distinctive apical bud

== Taxonomy ==
The genus is named after the Spanish exonym Araucano ("from Arauco") applied to the Mapuche of south-central Chile and south-west Argentina, whose territory incorporates natural stands of a species in this genus identified as A. araucana; the Mapuche people call it pewen, and consider it sacred. Some Mapuche living in the Andes name themselves Pewenche ("people of the pewen") as they traditionally harvested the seeds extensively for food.

There are four extant sections and two extinct sections in the genus, sometimes treated as separate genera.

Phylogeny of Araucaria

- - - - section Intermedia
        A. hunsteinii Schum.
    - - section Bunya
        A. bidwillii Hooker
      - section Araucaria
        - A. angustifolia (Bertoloni) Kuntze
        - A. araucana (Molina) Koch
  - - section Eutacta
      - A. cunninghamii Aiton ex A.Cunn.
      - - A. heterophylla (Salisbury) Franco
        - - A. muelleri (Carrière) Brongniart & Gris
          - - A. bernieri Buchholz
            - - A. subulata Vieillard
              - - A. biramulata Buchholz
                - - A. schmidii de Laubenfels
                  - - A. montana Brongniart & Gris
                    - - A. scopulorum de Laubenfels
                      - - A. laubenfelsii Corbasson
                        - - A. humboldtensis Buchholz
                          - - A. rulei von Mueller
                            - - A. luxurians (Brongniart & Gris) de Laubenfels
                              - - A. nemorosa de Laubenfels
                                - A. columnaris (Forster) Hooker

=== Extant species ===
Section	Image	Leaves	Name	Distribution
Section Araucaria Wilde and Eames, 1952			Araucaria angustifolia – Paraná pine or candelabra tree	southern and southeastern Brazil, northeastern Argentina.
Section Araucaria Wilde and Eames, 1952			Araucaria araucana – monkey-puzzle or pehuén	central Chile & western Argentina.
Section Bunya Wilde and Eames, 1952			Araucaria bidwillii – bunya-bunya	Eastern Australia
Section Intermedia White, 1947			Araucaria hunsteinii – klinki	New Guinea
Section Eutacta Endl. 1847
Section Eutacta Endl. 1847			Araucaria bernieri	New Caledonia
Section Eutacta Endl. 1847			Araucaria biramulata	New Caledonia
Section Eutacta Endl. 1847			Araucaria columnaris – Cook pine	New Caledonia
Section Eutacta Endl. 1847			Araucaria cunninghamii – Moreton Bay pine, hoop pine	Eastern Australia, New Guinea
Section Eutacta Endl. 1847			Araucaria goroensis	New Caledonia
Section Eutacta Endl. 1847			Araucaria heterophylla – Norfolk Island pine	Norfolk Island
Section Eutacta Endl. 1847			Araucaria humboldtensis	New Caledonia
Section Eutacta Endl. 1847			Araucaria laubenfelsii	New Caledonia
Section Eutacta Endl. 1847			Araucaria luxurians	New Caledonia
Section Eutacta Endl. 1847			Araucaria montana	New Caledonia
Section Eutacta Endl. 1847			Araucaria muelleri	New Caledonia
Section Eutacta Endl. 1847			Araucaria nemorosa	New Caledonia
Section Eutacta Endl. 1847			Araucaria rulei	New Caledonia
Section Eutacta Endl. 1847			Araucaria schmidii	New Caledonia
Section Eutacta Endl. 1847			Araucaria scopulorum	New Caledonia
Section Eutacta Endl. 1847			Araucaria subulata	New Caledonia

=== Genetic studies ===
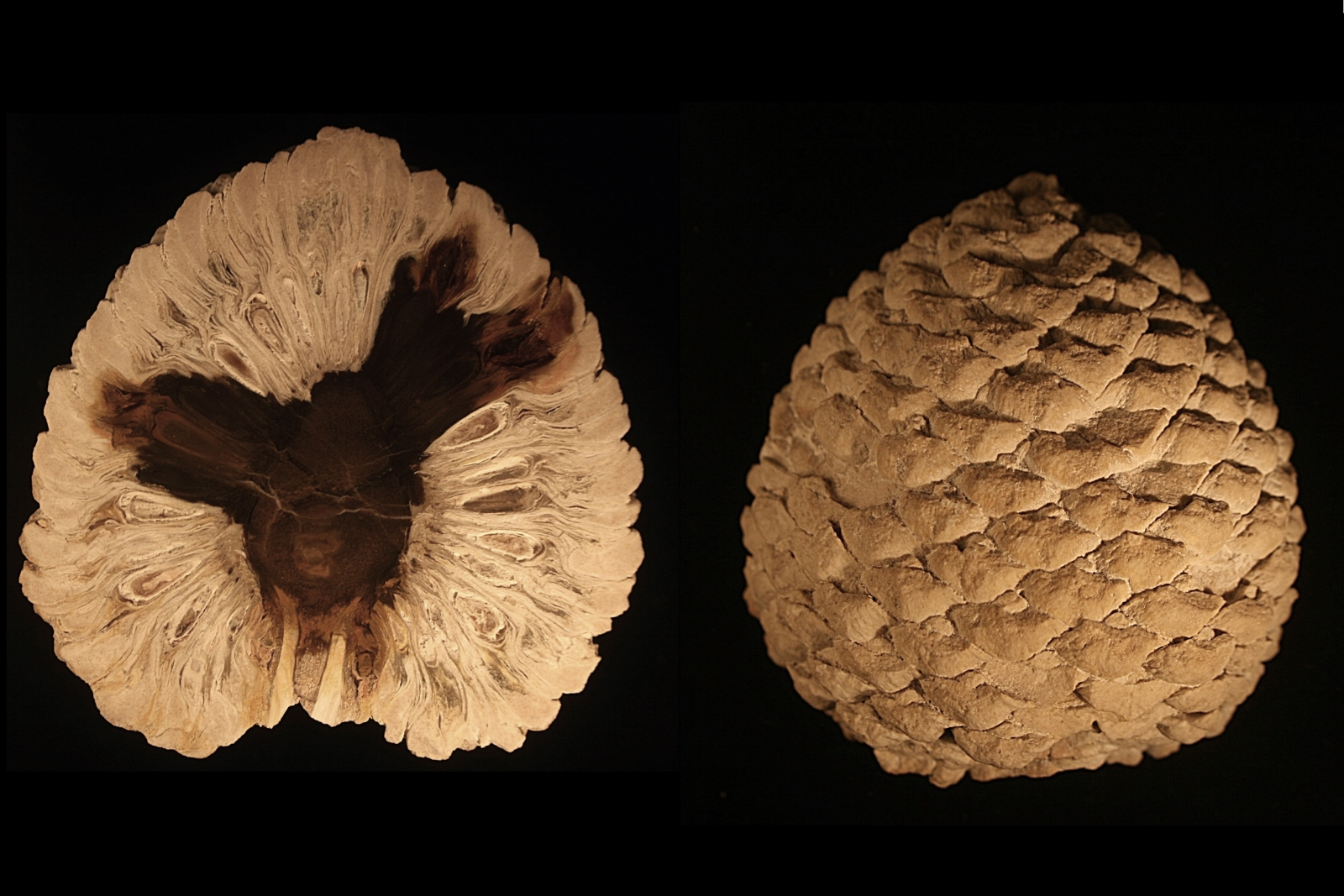
Petrified cone of Araucaria mirabilis from Patagonia, Argentina dating from the Jurassic Period (approx. 157 mya)

Genetic studies indicate that the extant members of the genus can be subdivided into two large clades – the first consisting of the sections Araucaria, Bunya, and Intermedia; and the second of the strongly monophyletic section Eutacta. Sections Eutacta and Bunya are both the oldest taxa of the genus, with Eutacta possibly older.

Taxa marked with † are extinct.

- Section Araucaria. Wilde and Eames, 1952 Leaves broad; cones more than 12 cm (4.7 in) diameter; seed germination hypogeal. Syn. sect. Columbea; sometimes includes Intermedia and Bunya
  - Araucaria angustifolia – Paraná pine (obsolete: Brazilian pine, candelabra tree); southern and southeastern Brazil, northeastern Argentina.
  - Araucaria araucana – monkey-puzzle or pehuén (obsolete: Chile pine); central Chile & western Argentina.
  - †Araucaria nipponensis – Japan and Sakhalin (Upper Cretaceous)
- Section Bunya. Wilde and Eames, 1952 Contains only one living species. Produces recalcitrant seeds with hypogeal (cryptocotylar) germination, though extinct species may have exhibited epigeal germination.
  - Araucaria bidwillii – bunya-bunya; Eastern Australia
- Section Intermedia. White, 1947 Contains only one living species. Produces recalcitrant seeds
  - Araucaria hunsteinii – klinki; New Guinea
  - †Araucaria haastii – New Zealand (Cretaceous)
- Section Eutacta. Endl. 1847 Leaves narrow, awl-like; cones less than 12 cm (4.7 in) diameter; seed germination epigeal
  - Araucaria bernieri – New Caledonia
  - Araucaria biramulata – New Caledonia
  - Araucaria columnaris – Cook pine; New Caledonia
  - Araucaria cunninghamii – Moreton Bay pine, hoop pine; Eastern Australia, New Guinea
  - Araucaria goroensis – New Caledonia
  - Araucaria heterophylla – Norfolk Island pine; Norfolk Island
  - Araucaria humboldtensis – New Caledonia
  - Araucaria laubenfelsii – New Caledonia
  - Araucaria luxurians – New Caledonia
  - Araucaria montana – New Caledonia
  - Araucaria muelleri – New Caledonia
  - Araucaria nemorosa – New Caledonia
  - Araucaria rulei – New Caledonia
  - Araucaria schmidii – New Caledonia
  - Araucaria scopulorum – New Caledonia
  - Araucaria subulata – New Caledonia
  - †Araucaria lignitici – (Paleogene) Yallourn, Victoria, Australia
  - †Araucaria famii – (Late Cretaceous) Vancouver Island, Canada.
- †Section Yezonia. Extinct. Contains only one species
  - †Araucaria vulgaris – Japan (Late Cretaceous)
- †Section Perpendicula. Extinct. Contains only one species
  - †Araucaria desmondii – New Zealand (Late Cretaceous)
- incertae sedis
  - †Araucaria antarctica – Snow Hill Island Formation, Antarctica (Late Cretaceous)
  - †Araucaria beipiaoensis – Tiaojishan Formation, China (Middle Jurassic)
  - †Araucaria delevoryasii – Morrison Formation, USA (Late Jurassic)
  - †Araucaria fibrosa – López de Bertodano Formation, Antarctica (Late Cretaceous)
  - †Araucaria marensii – La Meseta Formation, Antarctica & Santa Cruz Formation, Argentina
  - †Araucaria nihongii – Upper Yezo Group, Japan (Late Cretaceous)
  - †Araucaria taieriensis - New Zealand (Late Cretaceous)
  - †Araucaria brownii – England (Middle Jurassic)
  - †Araucaria mirabilis – Patagonia (Middle Jurassic)
  - †Araucaria sphaerocarpa – England (Middle Jurassic)
  - †Araucaria grandifolia – Argentina (Early Cretaceous)
  - †Araucaria jeffreyi – Eastern United States (Late Cretaceous)
  - †Araucaria benignae – Crato Formation, Brazil (Early Cretaceous (Aptian))

Araucaria bindrabunensis (previously classified under section Bunya) has been transferred to the genus Araucarites.

== Distribution and paleoecology ==
Three members of the genus growing together – left to right, A. columnaris, A. cunninghamii and A. bidwillii

Members of Araucaria are found in Argentina, Brazil, New Caledonia, Norfolk Island, Australia, New Guinea, Chile and Papua (Indonesia). Many if not all current populations are relicts, and of restricted distribution. They are found in forest and maquis shrubland, with an affinity for exposed sites. The earliest records of the genus date to the Middle Jurassic, represented by Araucaria mirabilis of Argentina, and Araucaria sphaerocarpa from England. Fossil records show that the genus also formerly occurred in the northern hemisphere until the end of the Cretaceous period.

A possible species of Araucaria may have existed in New Zealand as recently as 350,000 years ago. However, it is also possible that this fossil actually represents a specimen of Agathis. By far the greatest diversity exists in New Caledonia, likely due to a relatively recent adaptive radiation, as all New Caledonian species are more closely related to each other than they are to other Araucaria. Much of New Caledonia is composed of ultramafic rock with serpentine soils, with low levels of nutrients, but high levels of metals such as nickel. Consequently, its endemic Araucaria species are adapted to these conditions, and many species have been severely affected by nickel mining in New Caledonia and are now considered threatened or endangered, due to their habitat lying in prime areas for nickel mining activities.

Some evidence suggests that the long necks of sauropod dinosaurs may have evolved specifically to browse the foliage of tall trees, including those of Araucaria. An analysis of modern Araucaria leaves found that they have a high energy content but are slow fermenting, making their ancestors a likely attractive target. However, a diet consisting solely of Araucaria may not have provided dinosaurs with sufficient protein and was therefore unlikely.

== Uses ==
Some of the species are relatively common in cultivation because of their distinctive, formal symmetrical growth habit. Several species are economically important for timber production.

In addition to timber, they are grown for ornamental purposes. Several species are considered threatened/endangered.

=== Food ===
The edible large seeds of A. araucana, A. angustifolia and A. bidwillii — also known as Araucaria nuts, and often called, although improperly, pine nuts — are eaten as food, particularly among the Mapuche people of Chile and southwest Argentina, the Kaingang people in Southern Brazil and among Indigenous Australians. In South America, Araucaria nuts or seeds are called piñas or piñones in Spanish and pinhões in Portuguese, like pine nuts in Europe.

=== Pharmacological activity ===
Pharmacological reports on the genus Araucaria are anti-ulcer, antiviral, neuro-protective, anti-depressant and anti-coagulant.

== See also ==
- Agathis (kauri)
- Wollemia
