= Araucaria haastii =

Araucaria haastii Temporal range: Cretaceous

Scientific classification
- Kingdom: Plantae
- Clade: Tracheophytes
- Clade: Gymnospermae
- Division: Pinophyta
- Class: Pinopsida
- Order: Araucariales
- Family: Araucariaceae
- Genus: Araucaria
- Section: A. sect. Intermedia
- Species: †A. haastii

Binomial name
- †Araucaria haastii Ettingshausen (1887)

Extinct species of conifer

Araucaria haastii is an extinct species of conifer tree formerly native to New Zealand. A large number of fossilised tree specimens from the family Araucariaceae have been found in New Zealand, but in many cases the level of preservation is not sufficient to reliably distinguish between Araucaria species (related to extant modern trees such as the Norfolk pine) and Agathis species (related to New Zealand's kauri tree).

Araucaria haastii is known from some of the better preserved fossils, found in Cretaceous sediments from several sites in the South Island. These fossils show sufficiently detailed morphology and cuticular structure in the leaves to allow this species not only to be definitively identified as an Araucaria, but also to place it within the Intermedia section of this genus, meaning that its closest living relative is the klinki pine found in the mountains of Papua New Guinea. North Island fossil specimens from the same time period appear to be from a closely related but slightly distinct species of Araucaria, though the relatively poorer quality of the fossils means that the identification is not so precise. Related species of tree are also known from fossils found in Tasmania and South America, reflecting the broad Gondwanan distribution of the family Araucariaceae.

== See also ==
- Araucaria mirabilis
- Banksia novae-zelandiae
