= Araucaria goroensis =

Conservation status
- Endangered (IUCN 3.1)

Scientific classification
- Kingdom: Plantae
- Clade: Tracheophytes
- Clade: Gymnospermae
- Division: Pinophyta
- Class: Pinopsida
- Order: Araucariales
- Family: Araucariaceae
- Genus: Araucaria
- Species: A. goroensis

Binomial name
- Araucaria goroensis R.R.Mill & Ruhsam

Species of conifer

Araucaria goroensis is a tree of New Caledonia in the conifer family Araucariaceae.

== Distribution and habitat ==
Araucaria goroensis is endemic to New Caledonia. Its habitat is maquis shrubland from 150 m (500 ft) to 550 m (1,800 ft) altitude.
