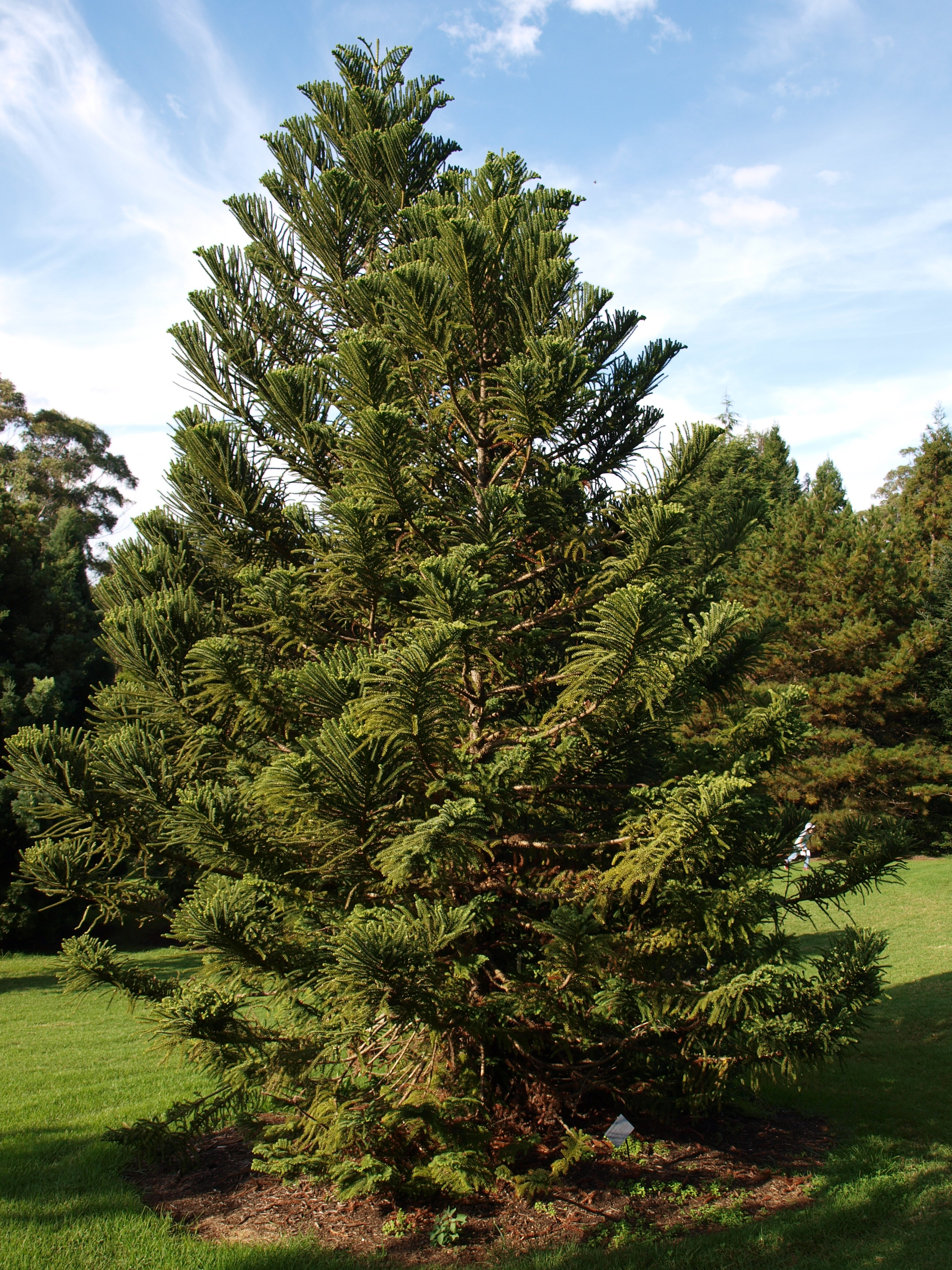

Conservation status
- Vulnerable (IUCN 3.1)

Scientific classification
- Kingdom: Plantae
- Clade: Tracheophytes
- Clade: Gymnosperms
- Division: Pinophyta
- Class: Pinopsida
- Order: Araucariales
- Family: Araucariaceae
- Genus: Araucaria
- Section: A. sect. Eutacta
- Species: A. biramulata

Binomial name
- Araucaria biramulata Buchh.

= Araucaria biramulata =

Species of conifer

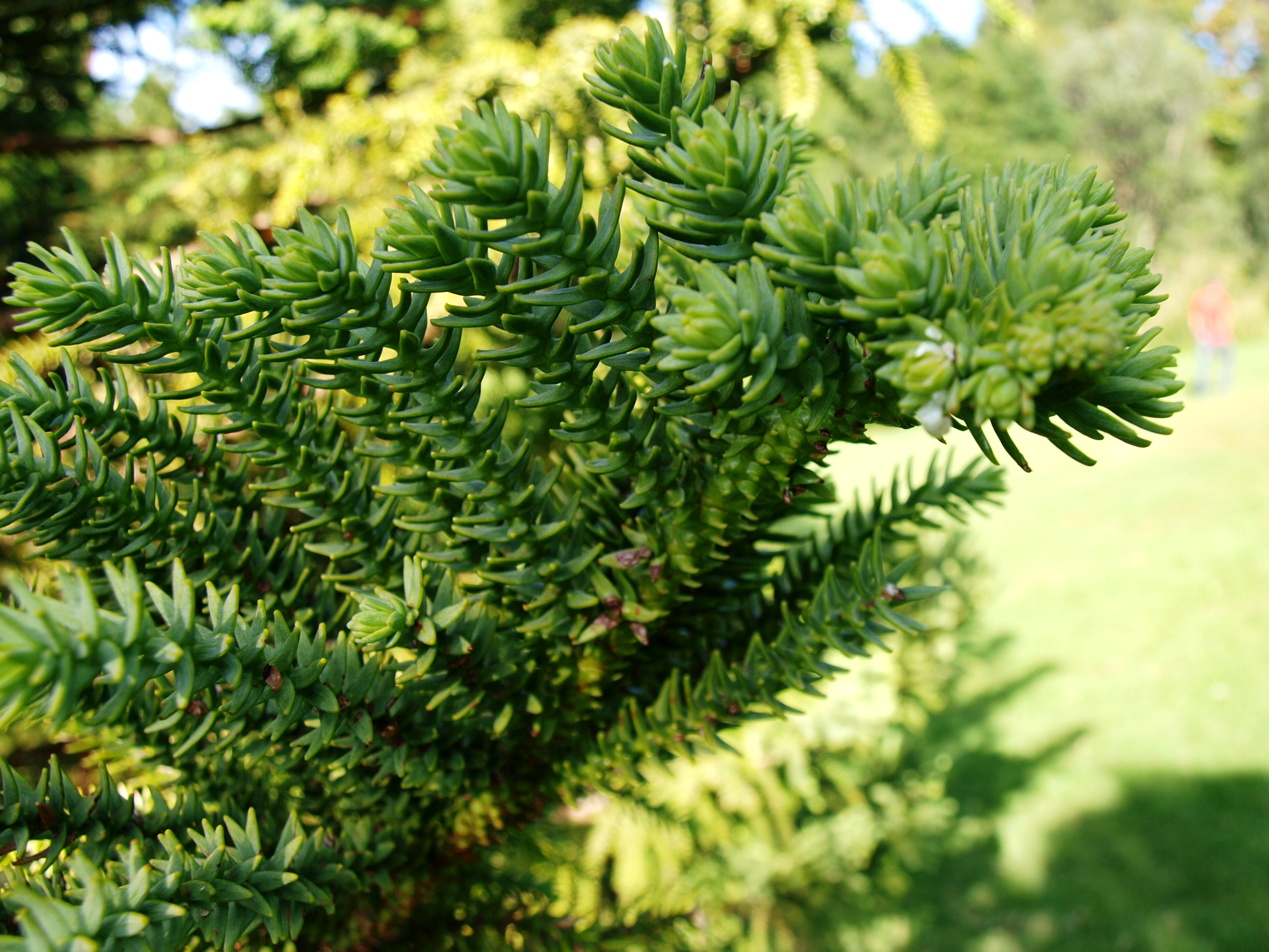
Araucaria biramulata in Blue Mountains Botanic Garden

Araucaria biramulata, the biramule araucaria, or piggyback araucaria, is a species of conifer in the family Araucariaceae. It is found only in New Caledonia on the main island of Grande Terre. Araucaria biramulata is a medium-large tree reaching 30 meters in height. As with several other endemic New Caledonian araucaria species, it is threatened by habitat loss with a fragmented wild population of less than 10,000 mature trees, and ongoing decline in remaining populations, with the main threats being forest fires and mining activities. Piggyback araucaria gets its common name from the unusual growth habit of mature trees, where they often develop a second growth tip halfway up the trunk, giving the appearance of a smaller tree "piggybacking" on the side of a larger one.
