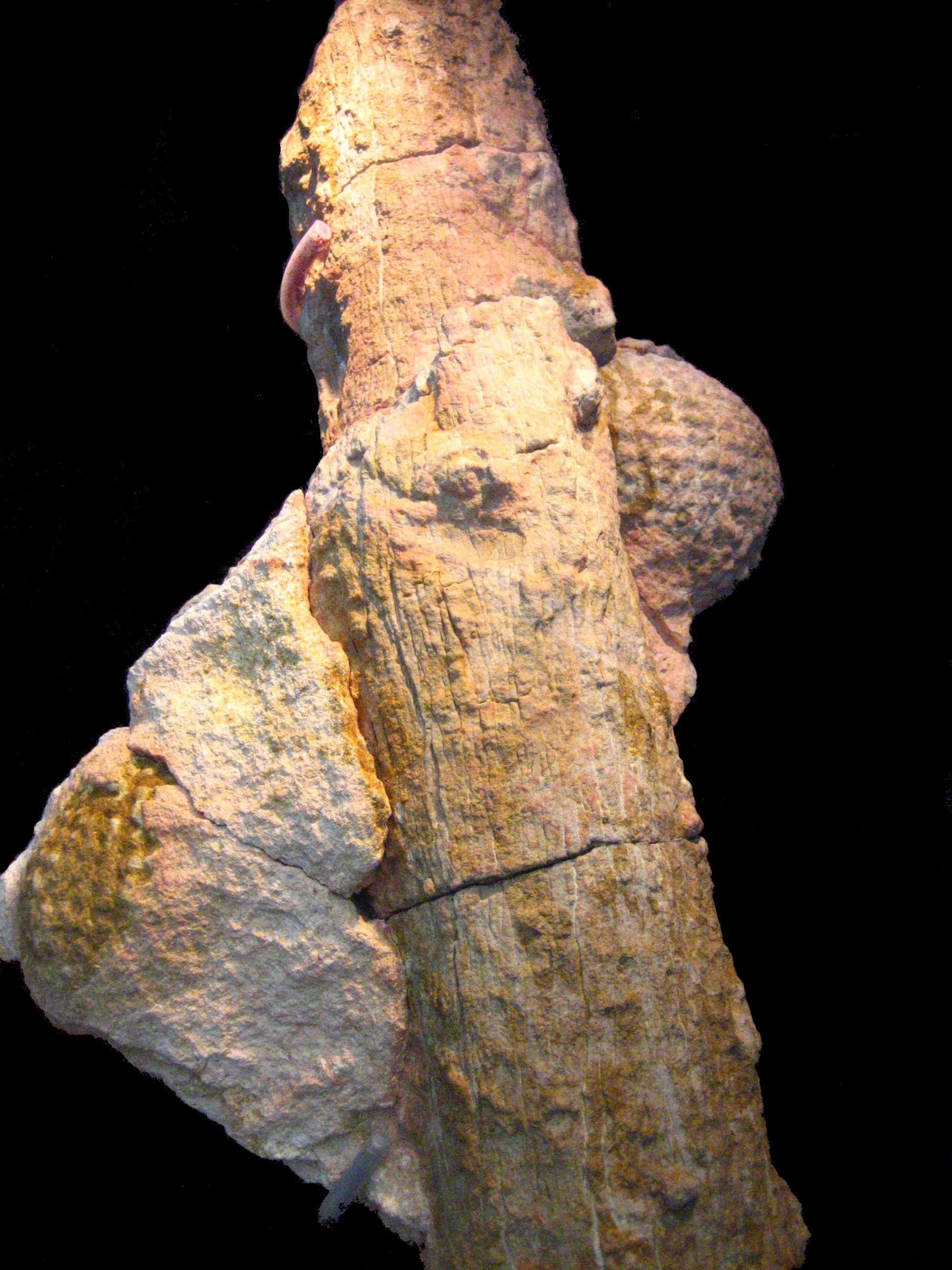
- Fossilized branch and cones of Araucaria mirabilis from Cerro Cuadrado, Patagonia, Argentina
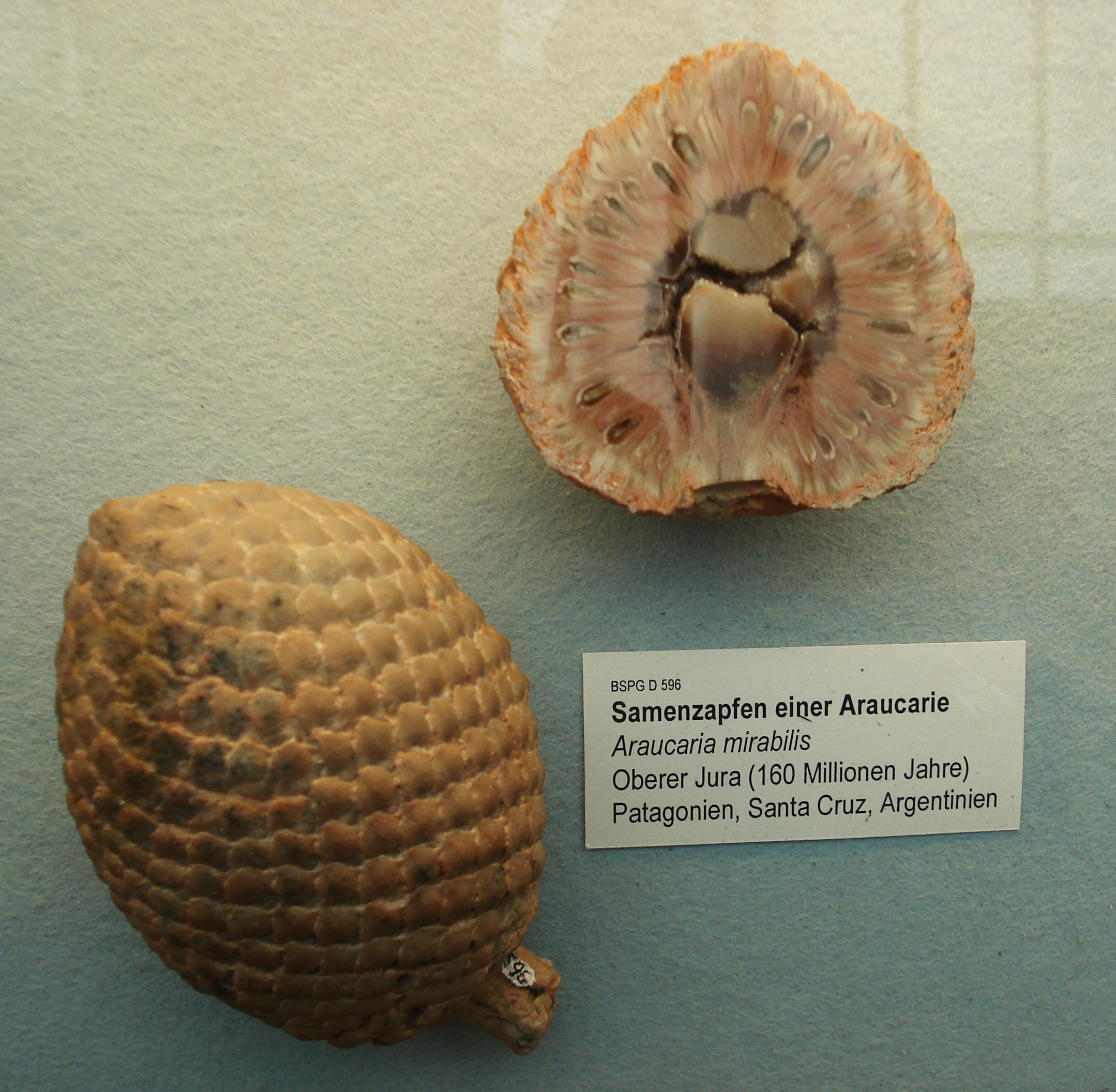
- Petrified Araucaria mirabilis cones from the Paläontologisches Museum München

Scientific classification
- Kingdom: Plantae
- Clade: Embryophytes
- Clade: Tracheophytes
- Clade: Spermatophytes
- Clade: Gymnosperms
- Division: Pinophyta
- Class: Pinopsida
- Order: Araucariales
- Family: Araucariaceae
- Genus: Araucaria
- Species: †A. mirabilis

Binomial name
- †Araucaria mirabilis (Spegazzini) Windhausen (1924)
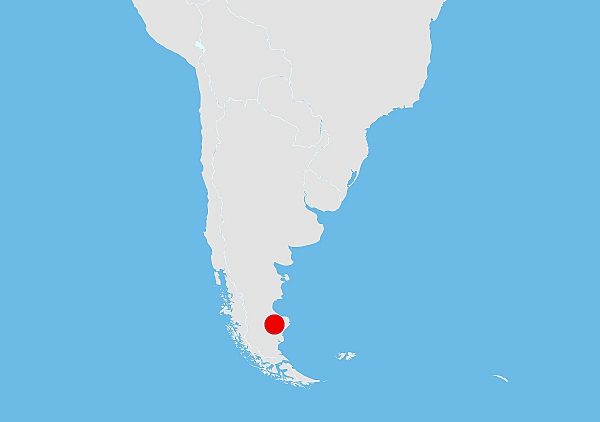
- Location of the Cerro Cuadrado Petrified Forest in Patagonia, Argentina

Synonyms
- Araucaria windhauseni Gothan; Araucarites mirabilis Spegazzini; Proaraucaria elongata Wieland; Proaraucaria mirabilis (Speg.) Wieland; Proaraucaria mirabilis var. minima Wieland; Proaraucaria patagonica Wieland

= Araucaria mirabilis =

Araucaria mirabilis Temporal range: (Callovian to Oxfordian (stage)), 164.7–155.7 Ma

Extinct species of conifer

Araucaria mirabilis is an extinct species of coniferous tree from Patagonia, Argentina. It belongs to the genus Araucaria.

A. mirabilis are known from large amounts of very well preserved silicified wood and cones from the Cerro Cuadrado Petrified Forest, including tree trunks that reached 100 m (330 ft) in height in life. The site was buried by a volcanic eruption during the Middle Jurassic, approximately 160 million years ago.

== Discovery ==
Fossils of Araucaria mirabilis are found in great abundance in the Cerro Cuadrado Petrified Forest of Patagonia, Argentina. They were the dominant species of a forest buried by a volcanic eruption about 160 million years ago.

The petrified forests of A. mirabilis were first discovered in 1919 by the German-Argentinean botanist Anselmo Windhausen. Noting that petrified cones were being kept as souvenirs by local farmers in the area, he explored the region and discovered the site of the petrified forests in 1923. He sent the specimens he collected to the German botanist Walther Gothan in Berlin in 1924. Gothan named them Araucaria windhauseni in honor of Windhausen in 1925.

However, the Italian-Argentinean botanist Carlo Luigi Spegazzini had also acquired specimens from the petrified forest from various sources. He tentatively identified the specimens as Araucarites mirabilis in 1924.

An American paleontological expedition led by Elmer S. Riggs (1923–1924) of the Field Museum of Natural History also discovered the petrified forests. The numerous specimens Riggs collected (who identified them as Araucaria) were later described by the American paleontologist and paleobotanist George Reber Wieland as Proaraucaria elongata (1929), Proaraucaria mirabilis (1935), and Proaraucaria patagonica (1935). Wieland and Gothan interpreted the absence of separate petrified seeds as evidence that the cones did not shed their scales at the final growth year. This was originally stated by Wieland as a justification for its classification under a new genus Proaraucaria.

An amended description was published by the Scottish paleobotanist Mary Gordon Calder in 1953. Calder questioned the conclusions of Wieland and Gothan. She also discarded the earlier classification of Spegazzini of Araucarites. The latter is a form genus, usually used for incomplete plant fossil specimens that resemble Araucaria but lack enough preserved details for more accurate classifications. Citing striking similarities with the extant Araucaria bidwillii, Calder reclassified the specimens as Araucaria mirabilis.

== Taxonomy and nomenclature ==
Araucaria mirabilis belongs to the genus Araucaria. It is classified under the family Araucariaceae of the order Pinales. It has previously been assigned to the section Bunya of Araucaria, which contains the living Australian bunya-bunya (Araucaria bidwillii). However, this has subsequently been questioned, with other studies finding it to have a basal position within Araucaria.

The genus name Araucaria is derived from the Spanish exonym Araucanos ("from Arauco"), referring to the Mapuche people of Chile and Argentina. The specific name mirabilis is from Latin for "wondrous" or "amazing".

== Description ==
A large number of petrified tree trunks of A. mirabilis are found still standing in the Cerro Cuadrado Petrified Forest. Preserved in volcanic ash, some of the specimens measure 3.5 m (11 ft) in diameter and were at least 100 m (330 ft) in height when alive. The trees were preserved just as the cones had finished maturing.

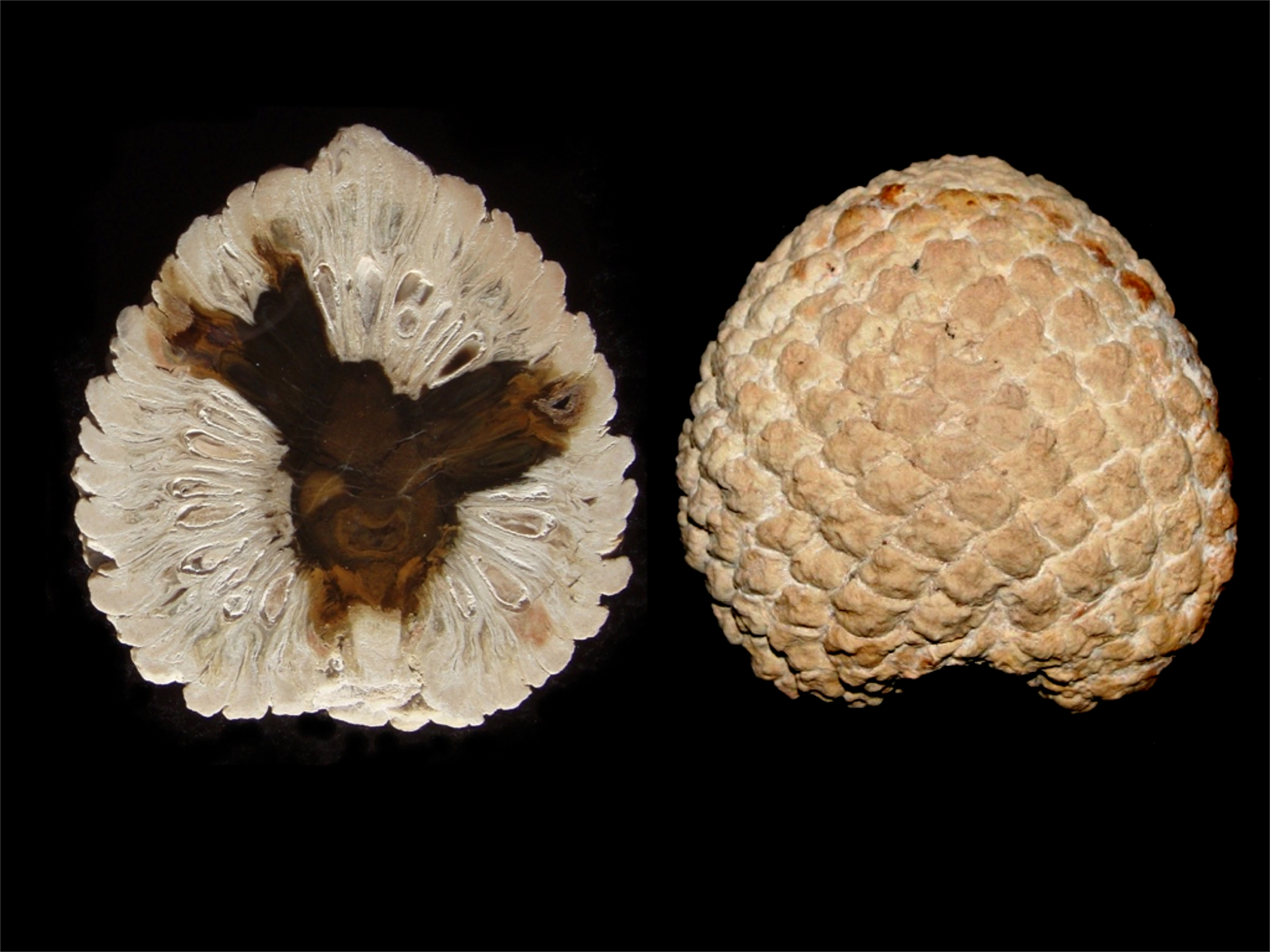
Petrified Araucaria mirabilis cones

The cones are spherical, ovoid to ellipsoidal in shape, with a wide axis. They average 2.5 to 8 cm (0.98 to 3.15 in) in length. The largest specimens are nearly 10 cm (3.9 in) in diameter. The center of the cones consist of a parenchymatous pith surrounded by fused vascular bundles (two for each bract-scale complex, with each vascular bundle containing resin canals).

The bracts have thick and wide woody wings tapering towards the base. They are around 13 to 16 mm (0.51 to 0.63 in) long and 10 mm (0.39 in) wide, including the wings. They are overlain by fertile scales containing one seed each, embedded on the upper surface. They are arranged helically. The "ligules" (the free tip of the fertile scale characteristic of Araucaria) are 4 mm (0.16 in) wide, 1 to 2 mm (0.039 to 0.079 in) high, and 5 mm (0.20 in) long.

The mature seeds of A. mirabilis are about 0.8 to 1.3 cm (0.31 to 0.51 in) long and 0.2 to 0.6 cm (0.079 to 0.236 in) wide. The seed integument has three layers of tissues – the sarcotesta, the thickened sclerotesta, and endotesta. It is fused to the nucellus (central portion of the ovule) only at the base. The sclerotesta (the "shell") also exhibits a zigzag pattern of sclereids. The fossilized seeds are exquisitely preserved, showing both mature and immature stages. They often contain well-developed dicotyledonous embryos, indicating that they were capable of lying dormant. The size of the cones did not indicate maturity as small cones around 5 cm (2.0 in) in diameter can be found with fully formed embryos. Most of the cones have been preserved before their seeds could be dispersed. Some cones, however, do not contain embryos and the naked axes of cones have also been recovered (described by Wieland as a separate species – Proaraucaria patagonica). It is believed that A. mirabilis shed only its seeds but not the scales at maturity. Nevertheless, no separate petrified seeds or bracts have been recovered.

Small woody corm-like structures have also been found. Initially identified as "seedlings", are now known to be lignotubers.

== Paleobiology and paleoecology ==
A. mirabilis exhibits two characteristics shared only by A. bidwillii among extant Araucaria species. First are the separate origins of the vascular bundles of the bract and fertile scales. Second is the highly vascularized "ligule". They also both have dicotyledonous embryos. On this basis, A. mirabilis is classified as belonging to the section Bunya.

However, the seeds of A. bidwillii are much larger, 5 to 6 cm (2.0 to 2.4 in) long and 2.5 to 3.5 cm (0.98 to 1.38 in) wide, than the seeds of A. mirabilis. A. bidwillii also exhibits cryptocotylar hypogeal germination (the cotyledons are non-photosynthetic and remain in the shell on germination), while there is evidence that indicates that A. mirabilis and other extinct members of the section Bunya exhibited epigeal germination (the cotyledons are photosynthetic and expand above-ground). In addition, no reliably identifiable fossils of members of the section Bunya have been recovered from Australia, the native range of A. bidwillii. The only existing species of Araucaria in South America today are Araucaria angustifolia and Araucaria araucana. Both belong to the section Araucaria of the genus. Setoguchi et al. (1998) have recommended that the extinct members of the section Bunya (which includes Araucaria sphaerocarpa of the United Kingdom) be treated as a separate group.

A. mirabilis is found in association with other conifers, including Pararaucaria patagonica (not to be confused with the synonym Proaraucaria patagonica of A. mirabilis), and Araucarites sanctaecrucis. P. patagonica is also known from cones. It has no living descendants and its closest living relatives appear to be members of the modern family Cupressaceae (cypresses). A. sanctaecrucis fossils consist of foliage and branches.

The fossils of the putative bracket fungus Phellinites digiustoi are also found in the Cerro Cuadrado Petrified Forest. The latter was initially believed to be the oldest known mushroom-forming fungus (Agaricomycetes). Later examinations now make it likely that P. digiustoi was, in fact, part of the periderm of the fossilized bark of A. mirabilis.

It is believed that the long necks of sauropod dinosaurs may have evolved specifically for browsing the foliage of the typically very tall A. mirabilis and other Araucaria trees. The energy-rich Araucaria leaves required long digestion times and were low in protein. This and the global distribution of vast forests of Araucaria makes it likely that they were the primary food sources for adult sauropods during the Jurassic. Juveniles, however, which lacked the bulk of the adults and required larger amounts of proteins for growth, probably subsisted on other plants.

A. mirabilis fossils have been found with damage resulting from beetle larvae. These beetles are believed to be the ancestors of the most ancient lineage of bark beetles in the weevil family (Curculionidae) - the members of the tribe Tomicini, which are still serious pests of conifers today. They were probably host-specific to members of the genus Araucaria since the Mesozoic. Modern A. bidwillii are also hosts to primitive weevils from the family Megalopodidae and leaf beetles from the family Nemonychidae.

== Distribution and geologic time range ==
Araucaria forests were distributed globally and formed a major part of the woody flora of the Mesozoic era. The Cerro Cuadrado Petrified Forest is part of the La Matilde Formation, dated to the Bathonian to Oxfordian ages (164.7 to 155.7 million years ago) of the Middle to Upper Jurassic. The area was once part of the subtropical and temperate regions of the southern supercontinent Gondwana in the Mesozoic era, a more or less continuous landmass consisting of what is now modern South America, Africa, Antarctica, India, Australia, New Zealand, and New Guinea.

== See also ==
- Paleobotany
- Araucaria haastii
- Araucarioxylon arizonicum
- Nothofagus
