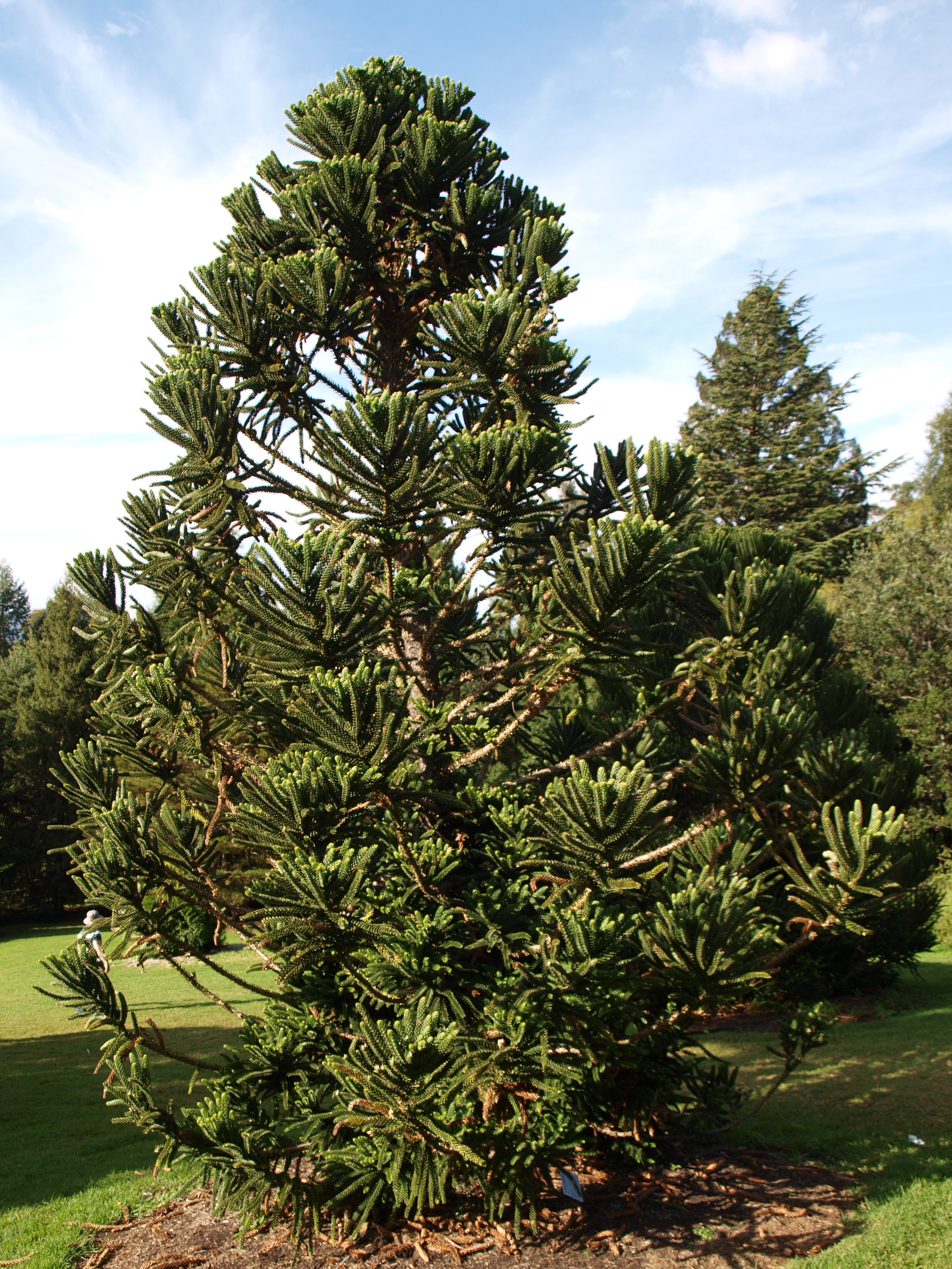
- Araucaria humboldtensis in Blue Mountains Botanic Garden

Conservation status
- Endangered (IUCN 3.1)

Scientific classification
- Kingdom: Plantae
- Clade: Tracheophytes
- Clade: Gymnosperms
- Division: Pinophyta
- Class: Pinopsida
- Order: Araucariales
- Family: Araucariaceae
- Genus: Araucaria
- Section: A. sect. Eutacta
- Species: A. humboldtensis

Binomial name
- Araucaria humboldtensis Buchh.

= Araucaria humboldtensis =

Species of conifer

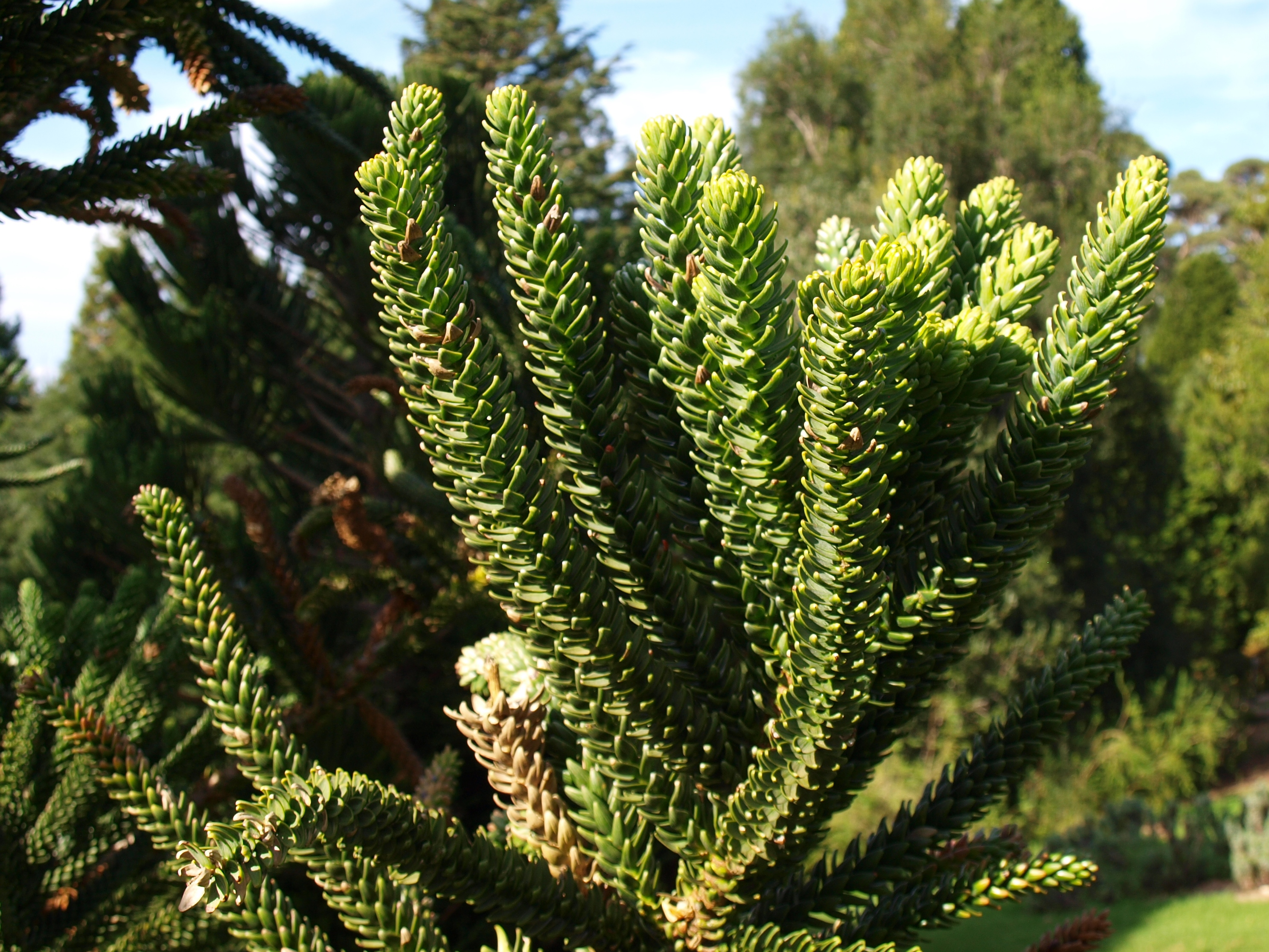

Araucaria humboldtensis, or Humboldt's araucaria, is a species of conifer in the family Araucariaceae. It is found only in New Caledonia. It is threatened by habitat loss, as even though the remaining wild populations are located within protected park areas, an increased frequency of forest fires in recent years has led to continued degradation of habitat and increased dieback of mature trees.

Araucaria humboldtensis is one of the smaller trees in its family, ranging from 6–15 m in height, with a distinct flattened crown in mature specimens. It is found in the wild only in three remnant populations in the south of the main island Grand Terre, growing on Mont Humboldt, Mont Mou and Mont des Sources at an altitude of between 750 and 1500 m.
