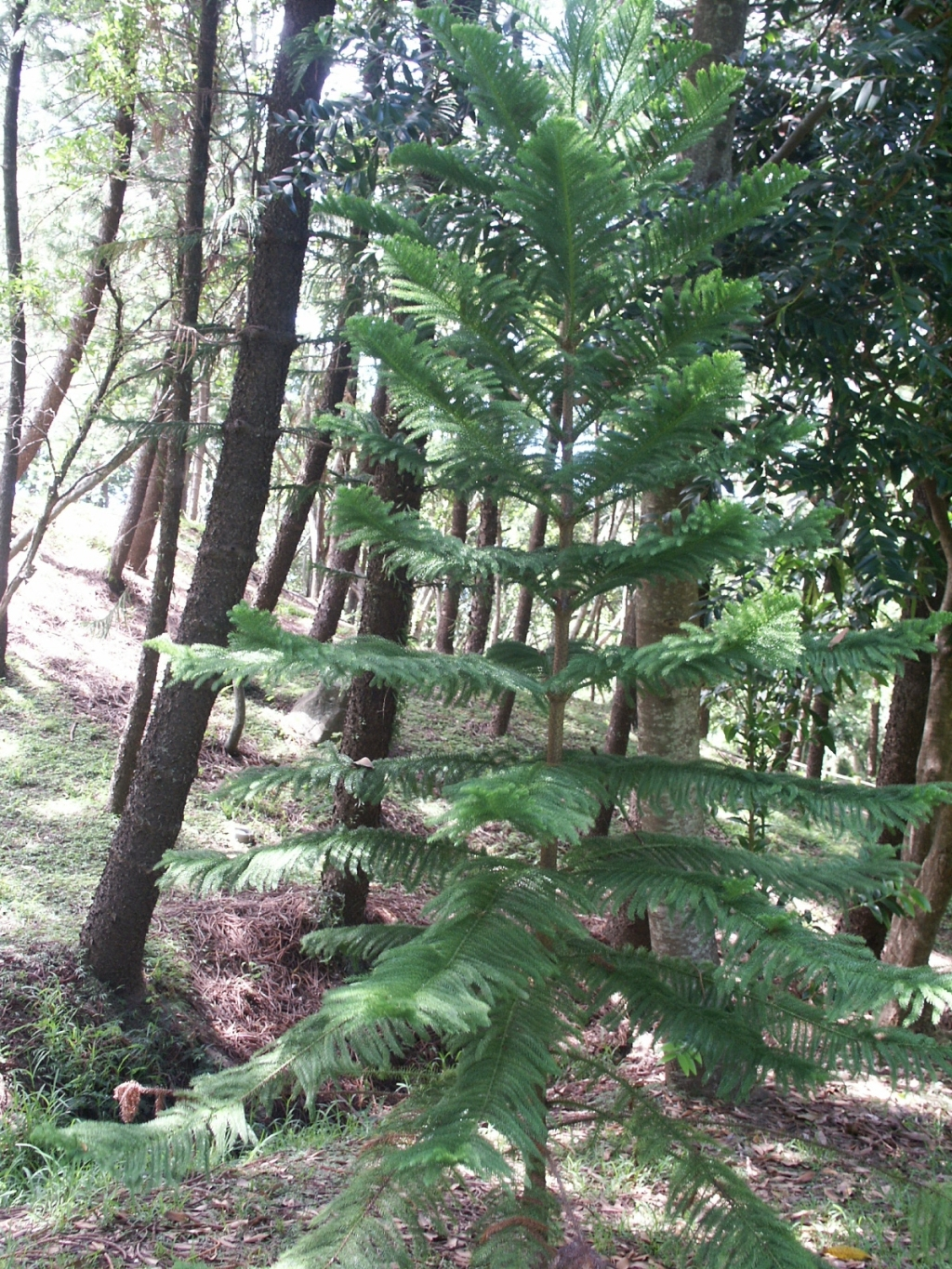

Conservation status
- Critically Endangered (IUCN 3.1)

Scientific classification
- Kingdom: Plantae
- Clade: Tracheophytes
- Clade: Gymnosperms
- Division: Pinophyta
- Class: Pinopsida
- Order: Araucariales
- Family: Araucariaceae
- Genus: Araucaria
- Section: A. sect. Eutacta
- Species: A. nemorosa

Binomial name
- Araucaria nemorosa de Laub.

Synonyms
- Eutassa nemorosa (de Laub.) de Laub.

= Araucaria nemorosa =

Species of conifer

Araucaria nemorosa (Boise araucaria) is a species of conifer in the family Araucariaceae. It is found only in New Caledonia, an island possession of France in the South Pacific. It is mostly found as a small understory tree, typically growing to no more than 15 meters (though rarely reaching 30m), and relatively shade tolerant, though it can also grow as an emergent from coastal scrub. It has feathery foliage somewhat less spiky than most other Araucaria species, and is found only on serpentine soil, in coastal locations below 100m in altitude. It is threatened by habitat loss and is a critically endangered species with less than 5000 trees remaining in the wild. Low levels of genetic variation in the remaining population and consequent low germination rates of seed produced, are also a concern.
