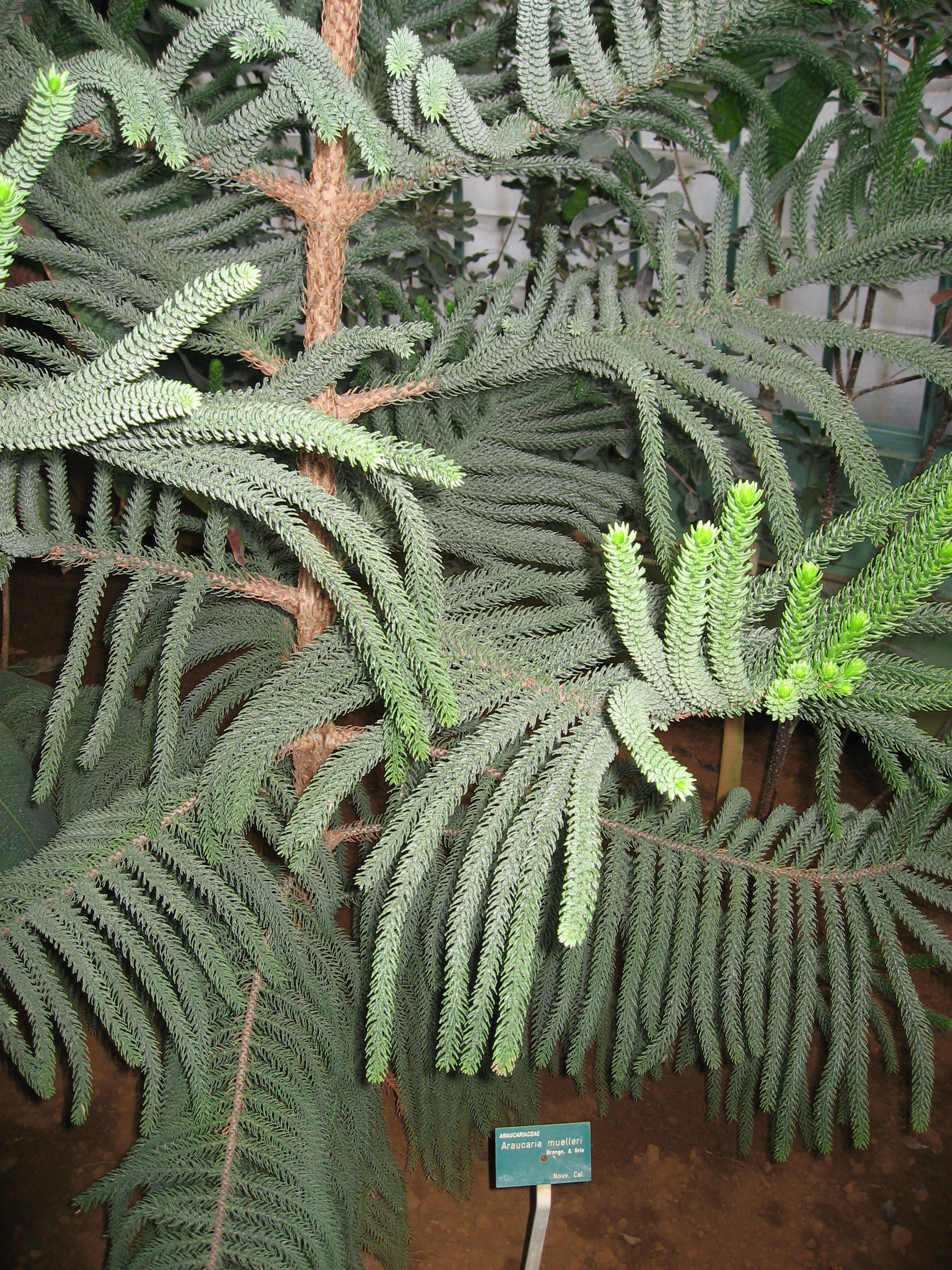

Conservation status
- Endangered (IUCN 3.1)

Scientific classification
- Kingdom: Plantae
- Clade: Tracheophytes
- Clade: Gymnosperms
- Division: Pinophyta
- Class: Pinopsida
- Order: Araucariales
- Family: Araucariaceae
- Genus: Araucaria
- Section: A. sect. Eutacta
- Species: A. muelleri

Binomial name
- Araucaria muelleri (Carrière) Brongn. & Gris

Synonyms
- Eutassa latifolia de Laub.; Eutacta muelleri Carrière; Eutassa muelleri (Carrière) de Laub.

= Araucaria muelleri =

Species of conifer

Araucaria muelleri is a species of conifer in the family Araucariaceae. It is a medium size tree, 10–25 meters in height, with larger leaves than most other New Caledonian Araucarias. It is found only in New Caledonia, in several sites in the far south of Grande Terre, the main island.

== Conservation ==
The species is threatened by habitat loss, with both forest fires and nickel mining activities posing ongoing threats to the remaining populations, although some stands of trees are located within protected national park areas.
