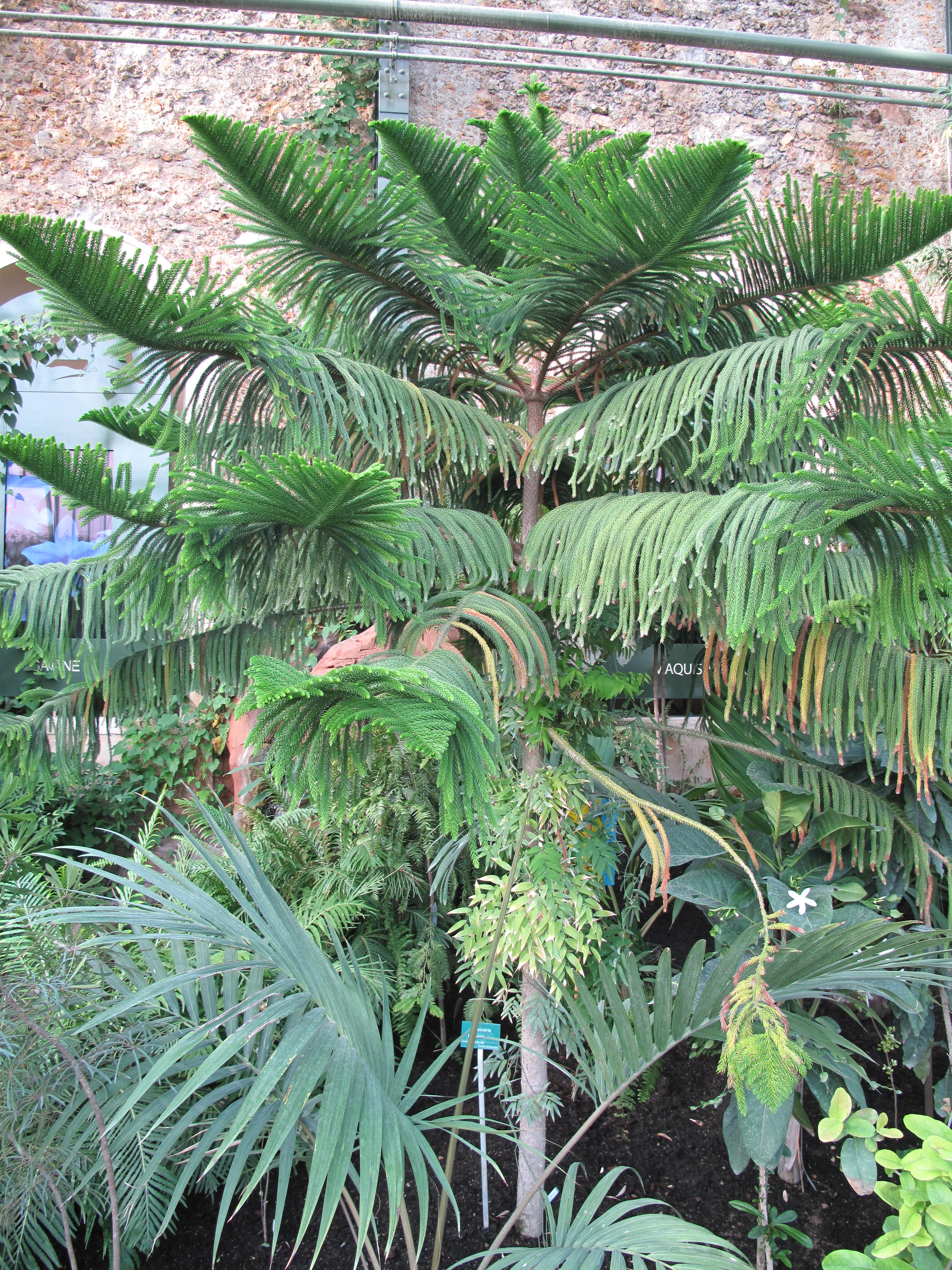

Conservation status
- Near Threatened (IUCN 3.1)

Scientific classification
- Kingdom: Plantae
- Clade: Tracheophytes
- Clade: Gymnosperms
- Division: Pinophyta
- Class: Pinopsida
- Order: Araucariales
- Family: Araucariaceae
- Genus: Araucaria
- Section: A. sect. Eutacta
- Species: A. subulata

Binomial name
- Araucaria subulata Vieill.

= Araucaria subulata =

Species of conifer

Araucaria subulata (narrow-leaf araucaria) is a species of conifer in the family Araucariaceae. It is found only in New Caledonia, with scattered populations present across the central and southern mountain regions of the main island Grande Terre, especially on Mont Dzumac and Mont des Sources. It is one of the tallest of New Caledonia's endemic araucaria species, reaching up to 50 meters in height. Young trees, like the one in the picture, show similar growth habits to the Norfolk Island Pine. It is threatened by habitat loss as with all of New Caledonia's araucaria trees, but populations of Araucaria subulata are currently considered to be stable and it was not found to be threatened or endangered when most recently assessed.
