= Araucaria schmidii =

Conservation status
- Vulnerable (IUCN 3.1)

Scientific classification
- Kingdom: Plantae
- Clade: Tracheophytes
- Clade: Gymnosperms
- Division: Pinophyta
- Class: Pinopsida
- Order: Araucariales
- Family: Araucariaceae
- Genus: Araucaria
- Section: A. sect. Eutacta
- Species: A. schmidii

Binomial name
- Araucaria schmidii de Laub.

Synonyms
- Eutassa schmidii (de Laub.) de Laub.

Species of conifer

Araucaria schmidii (Schmid araucaria) is a species of conifer in the family Araucariaceae. It is a medium to large tree growing up to 30 meters tall. It is found only in a small area on New Caledonia, with only one contiguous population in an area covering less than one square kilometer on the summit and highest slopes of Mont Panié in the north-east of the main island, Grande Terre, though a few scattered individuals may still be found on surrounding peaks. It is threatened by habitat loss. While the single remaining population is in a protected national park in a remote area, this area is still regularly visited by tourists, and IUCN has expressed concern that the entire population is at risk of being wiped out by a chance event such as the introduction of a fungal disease (e.g. Phytophthora).
