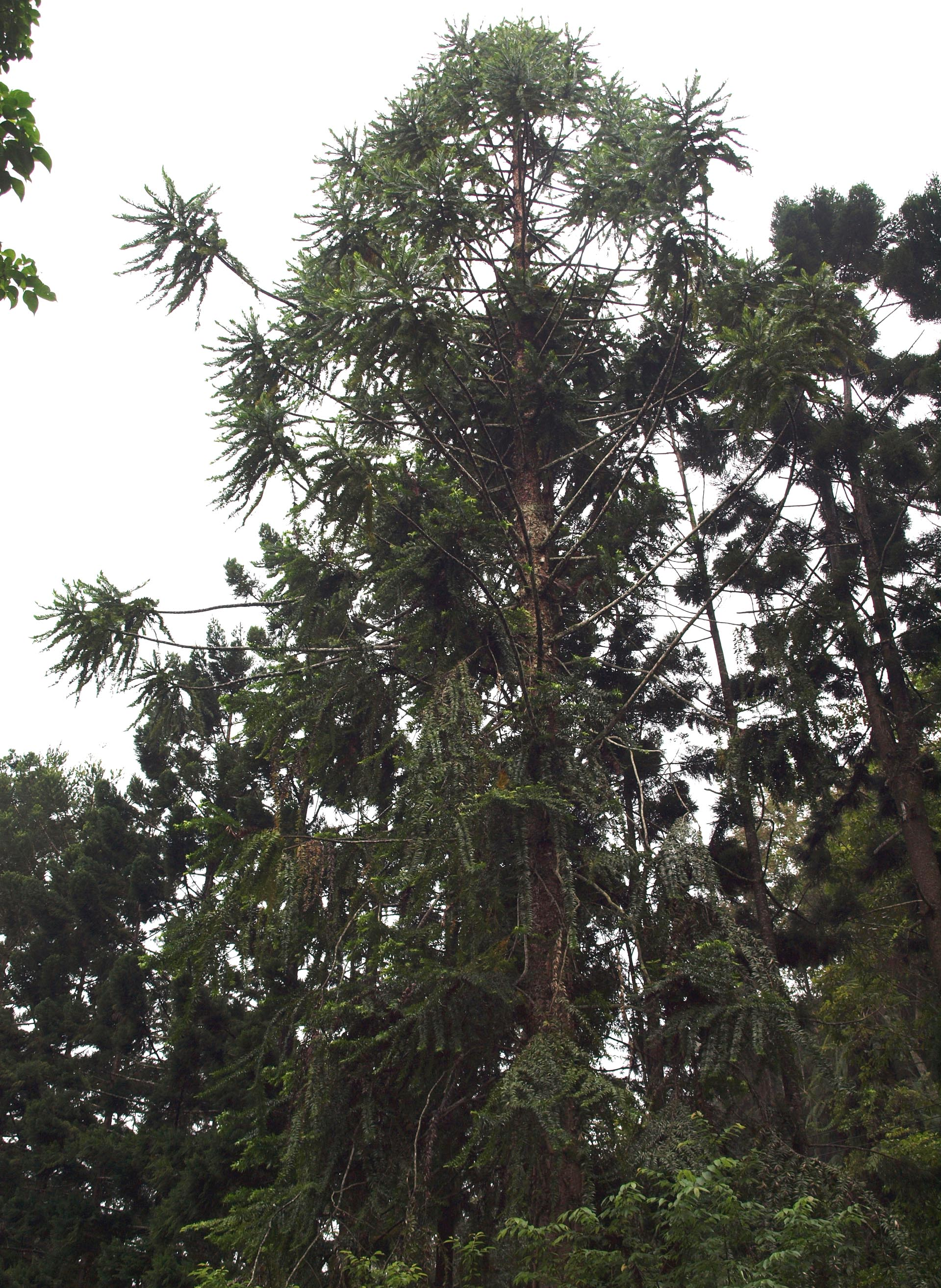

Conservation status
- Near Threatened (IUCN 3.1)

Scientific classification
- Kingdom: Plantae
- Clade: Tracheophytes
- Clade: Gymnosperms
- Division: Pinophyta
- Class: Pinopsida
- Order: Araucariales
- Family: Araucariaceae
- Genus: Araucaria
- Section: A. sect. Intermedia
- Species: A. hunsteinii

Binomial name
- Araucaria hunsteinii K.Schum.

= Araucaria hunsteinii =

Papua New Guinean pine tree

Araucaria hunsteinii (Klinki, Klinki Pine) is a species of conifer in the family Araucariaceae, native to the mountains of Papua New Guinea. It is threatened by habitat loss.

== Description ==
It is a very large evergreen tree (the tallest in New Guinea, and the tallest species in its family), growing to 50–80 metres (164–262 ft) tall, exceptionally to 90 m (295 ft), with a trunk up to 3 m (10 ft) diameter. The branches are horizontal, produced in whorls of five or six. The leaves are spirally arranged, scale-like or awl-like, 6–12 centimetres (2–5 in) long and 1.5–2 cm (5/8–3/4 in) broad at the base, with a sharp tip; leaves on young trees are shorter (under 9 cm or 4 in) and narrower (under 1.5 cm or 5/8 in). It is usually monoecious with male and female cones on the same tree; the pollen cones are long and slender, up to 20 cm (8 in) long and 1 cm (3/8 in) broad; the seed cones are oval, up to 25 cm (10 in) long and 14–16 cm (5 1/2–6 1/4 in) broad. The seed cones disintegrate at maturity to release the numerous 3–4 cm (1–1 1/2 in) long nut-like seeds.

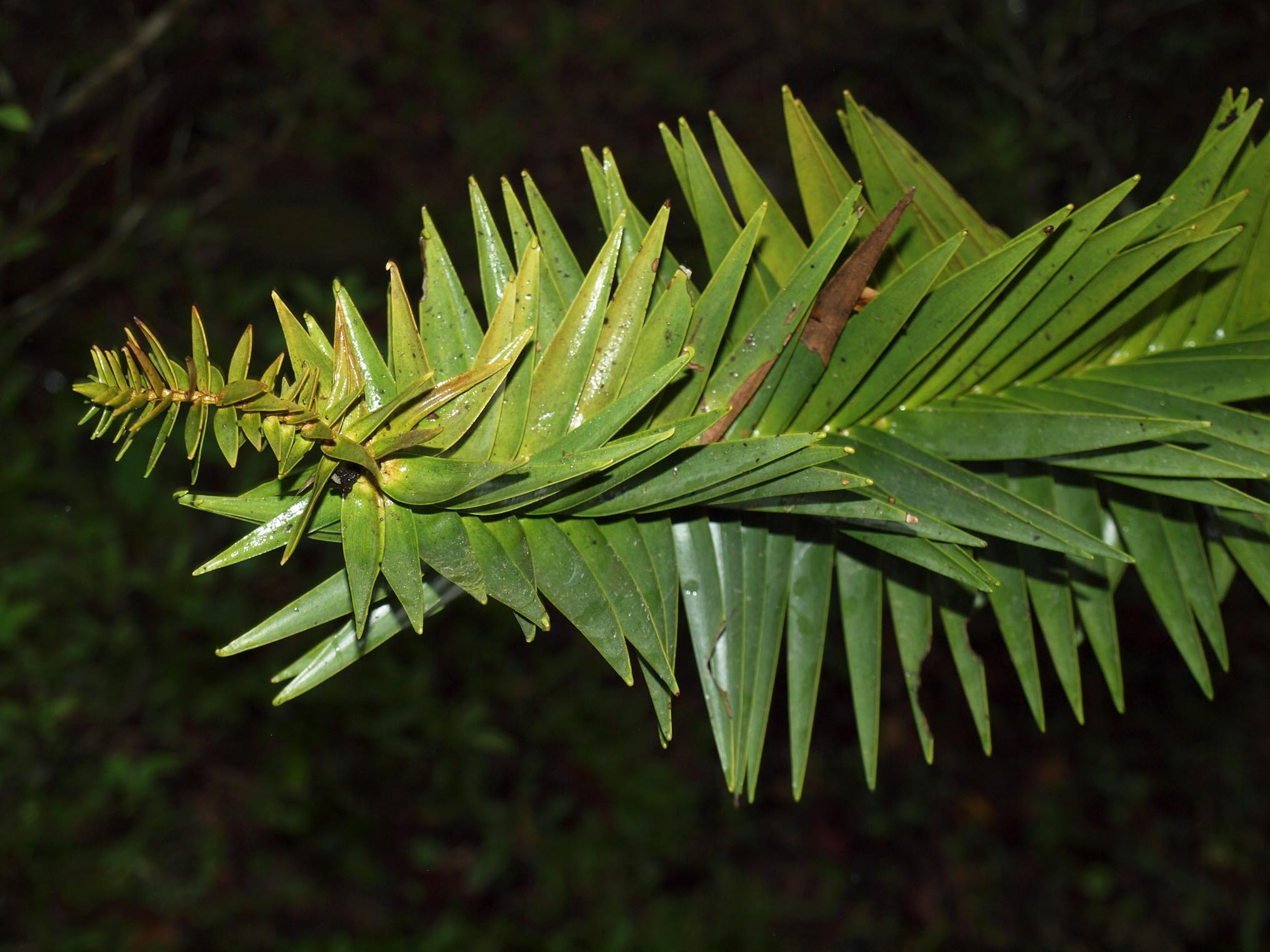
Mature leaf detail

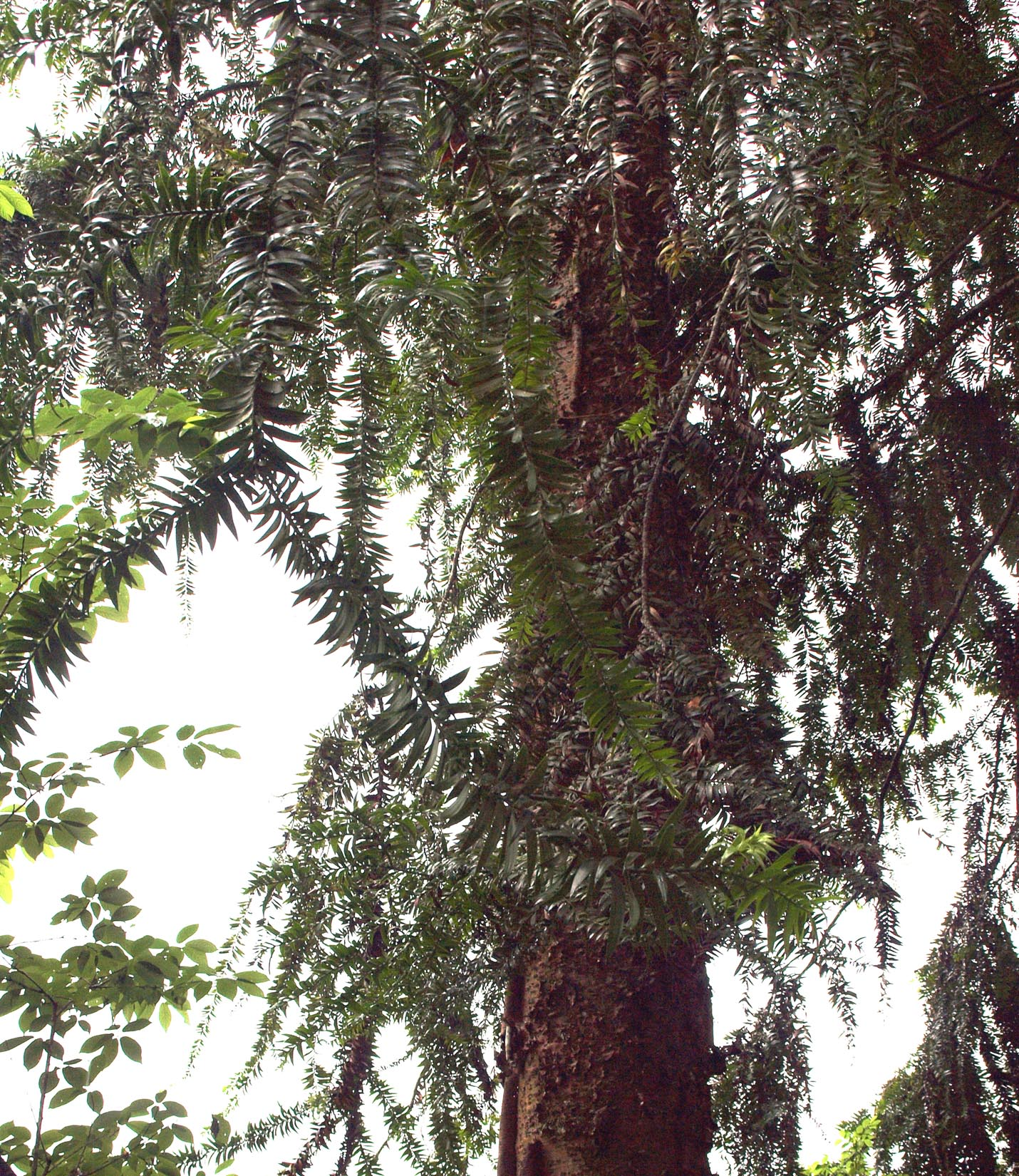
Mature trunk detail

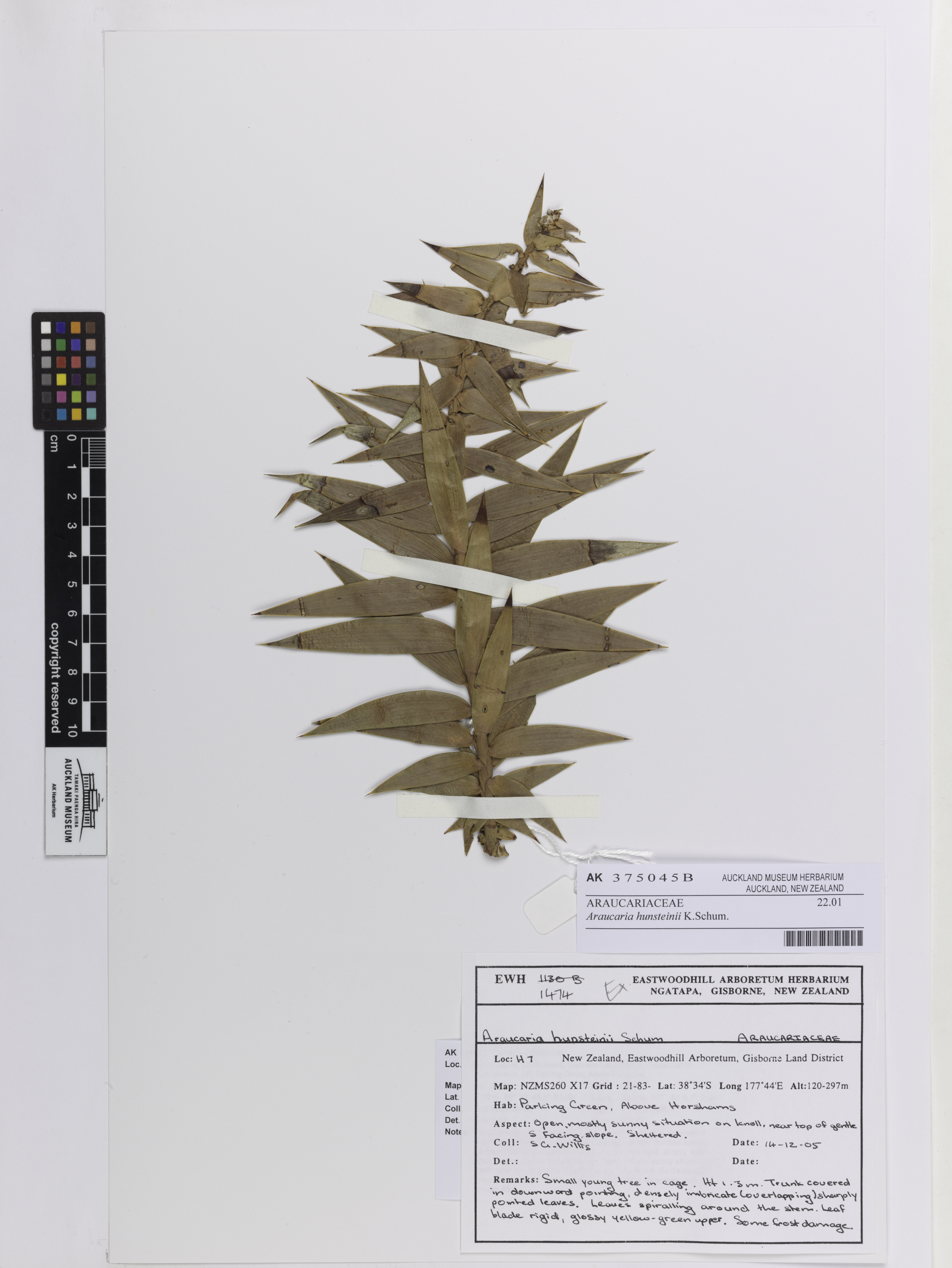
A. hunsteinii var. klinky specimen

== Cultivation and uses ==
It is a fast-growing tree, and is being tested as a potentially important timber crop in tropical highland climates.

=== Pests ===
Barinae spp., (Note: Curculionidae: 9. Barinae sp.; COLLECTIONS: In seed cone of Araucaria hunsteinii, Bulolo, M. D., 29.VIII.1967 (J. Thompson). DISTRIBUTION AND BIOLOGY : The weevil honeycombs extensively the cones of A. hunsteinii seeds in the virgin forest (Havel 1962). Up to 30-40% of the seed may be damaged; the damage varies considerably from area to area in the Wau-Bulolo area (J. Thompson, pers. comm., 1967).) Setomorpha rutella, (Note: Tineidae: 51. Setomorpha rutella Zeller; COLLECTIONS: In seed of Araucaria hunsteinii, Bulolo, M. D., VI.1964 (J.L.R. Godlee). DISTRIBUTION AND BIOLOGY : G. S. Dun reared adults from the seed collected by Mr Godlee. The larvae cause considerable damage to the seed.) Microlepidopteras, (Note: p. 391, 4.5. Insect pests of Araucaria species in New Guinea A number of as yet unidentified members of the Microlepidoptera also cause much wastage in cones of A. cunninghamii and A. hunsteinii.") Cacatua galerita (the Sulphur-crested cockatoo) are pests of pine nut production in A. hunsteinii. C. galerita may cause half of the seed crop to be lost in a year, mostly by trying to eat cones that are not yet ready. (Note: p. 391, 4.6. Other predators... The foraging activity of birds such as the Sulphur-Crested Cockatoo (Cacatua galerita) may lead to destruction of half or more of annual cone crops. Department of Forests (PNG) records suggest that over 50% of the A. hunsteinii cone crop in the Susu Mountain area, Bulolo was destroyed by cockatoos in successive years (1966 and 1967). Cacatua galerita is a notoriously wasteful eater and most seed is lost through the premature fall of green cones which are left to rot on the forest floor.") Another source describes A. hunsteinii as suffering few pests in plantations and therefore substituting A. cunninghamii in plantations with more pests.

=== Uses ===
It is related to the Monkey Puzzle Tree (A. Araucana,) and both of these species contain seeds which can be eaten.
