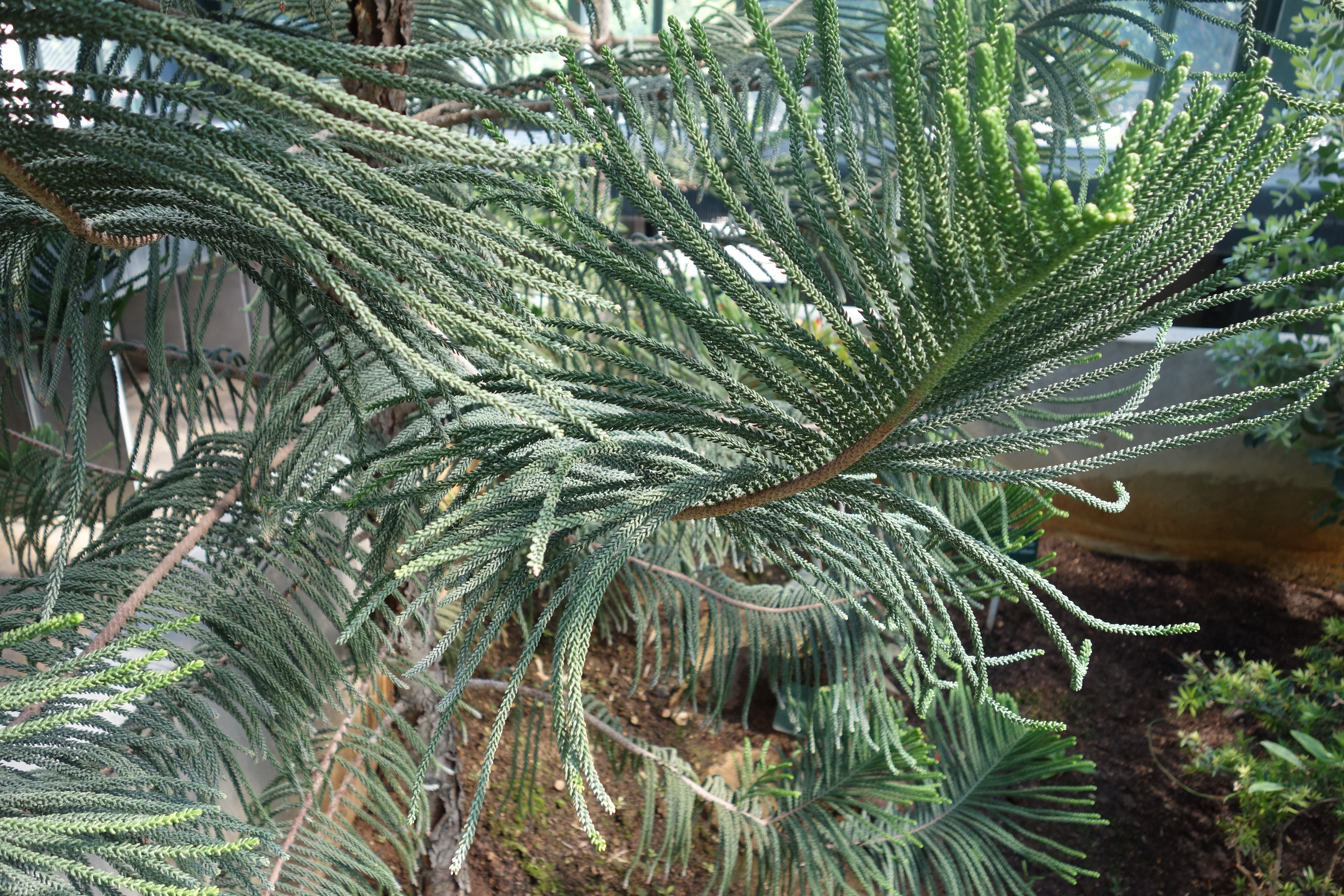

Conservation status
- Endangered (IUCN 3.1)

Scientific classification
- Kingdom: Plantae
- Clade: Tracheophytes
- Clade: Gymnosperms
- Division: Pinophyta
- Class: Pinopsida
- Order: Araucariales
- Family: Araucariaceae
- Genus: Araucaria
- Section: A. sect. Eutacta
- Species: A. scopulorum

Binomial name
- Araucaria scopulorum de Laub.

Synonyms
- Eutassa scopulorum (de Laub.) de Laub.; Araucaria bernieri var. pumilio Silba

= Araucaria scopulorum =

Species of conifer

Araucaria scopulorum (rock araucaria) is a species of conifer in the family Araucariaceae. It is endemic to New Caledonia, where it is an endangered species. It occurs in small populations that are restricted to two main areas. It grows in shrubland on steep coastal slopes below 300 m (1,000 ft) in altitude. Araucaria scopulorum is a relatively small tree compared to most other araucarias, with mature trees varying from 4–20 m (10–70 ft) in height. Much of its habitat is located in areas with active nickel mining operations and no populations are in protected areas.
