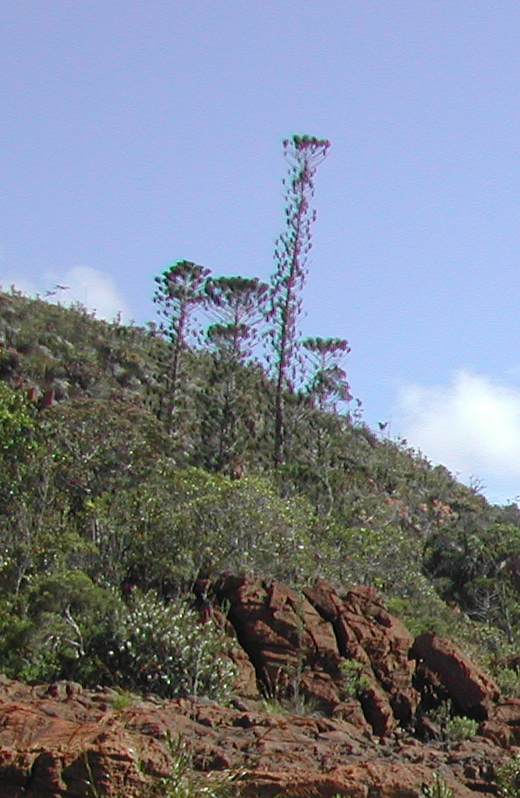

Conservation status
- Near Threatened (IUCN 3.1)

Scientific classification
- Kingdom: Plantae
- Clade: Tracheophytes
- Clade: Gymnosperms
- Division: Pinophyta
- Class: Pinopsida
- Order: Araucariales
- Family: Araucariaceae
- Genus: Araucaria
- Section: A. sect. Eutacta
- Species: A. bernieri

Binomial name
- Araucaria bernieri Buchh.

= Araucaria bernieri =

Species of conifer

Araucaria bernieri, commonly known as Bernier's columnar araucaria, is a species of conifer in the family Araucariaceae. It is found only in New Caledonia at elevations below 700 meters, mainly in the southern part of the main island. It is a large tree reaching 40–50 meters in height, though specimens growing on poorer soil tend to be dwarfed. It is threatened by habitat loss with a wild population of less than 10,000 mature trees, and ongoing decline in remaining populations.
