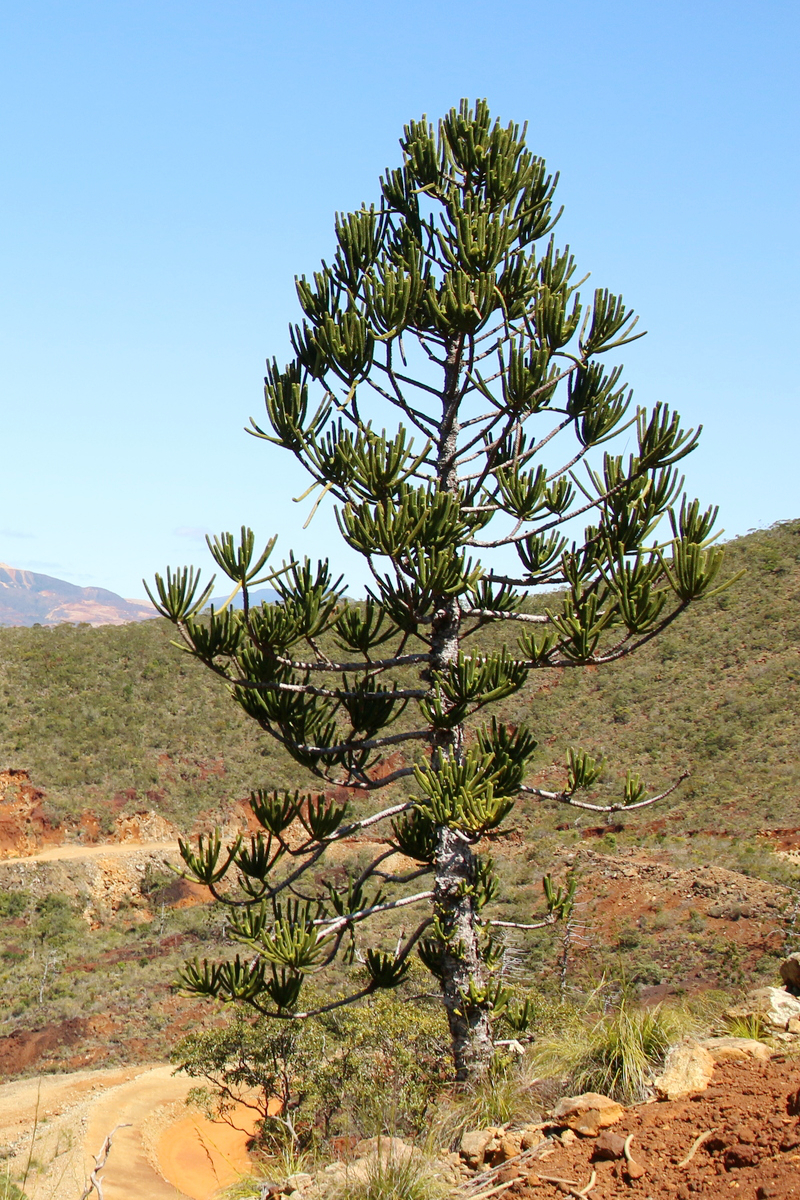
- Tree in Poro, New Caledonia

Conservation status
- Endangered (IUCN 3.1)

Scientific classification
- Kingdom: Plantae
- Clade: Tracheophytes
- Clade: Gymnosperms
- Division: Pinophyta
- Class: Pinopsida
- Order: Araucariales
- Family: Araucariaceae
- Genus: Araucaria
- Section: A. sect. Eutacta
- Species: A. rulei

Binomial name
- Araucaria rulei F.Muell.

= Araucaria rulei =

Species of conifer

Araucaria rulei (Rule's araucaria) is a species of conifer in the family Araucariaceae. It is endemic to New Caledonia, where it is an endangered species. Its populations are fragmented, and are generally made up of scattered individuals. It is restricted to dry serpentine soils at altitudes up to 1,000 m (3,300 ft), often with high nickel levels, with its natural range is almost completely restricted to areas rich in nickel. Nickel mining in New Caledonia has consequently been a major cause of its decline.

Araucaria rulei grows to around 30 m (100 ft) in height, with long slender branches arranged symmetrically around the trunk, which extend horizontally and then turn upwards and branch out at the end, giving the tree an appearance sometimes compared to a chandelier. Male and female cones are produced on the same tree but on different branches, with branches at the top of the tree tending to produce female cones, while branches lower down make male cones. The seed cones are around 12 cm (5 in) long by 8 cm (3 in) broad, and stay on the tree for 2–3 years while the seeds ripen; these are around 3 cm (1.2 in) long when mature. It is a slow-growing plant with slow regeneration capabilities, though in its natural environment it is tolerant of both very dry conditions and high winds which many other species of araucaria will not tolerate. The species was named after the Australian nurseryman John Rule, and is sometimes grown as an ornamental tree in Australia; its large smooth leaves and the symmetrical dome shaped growth habit of mature trees are considered attractive.

== Gallery ==
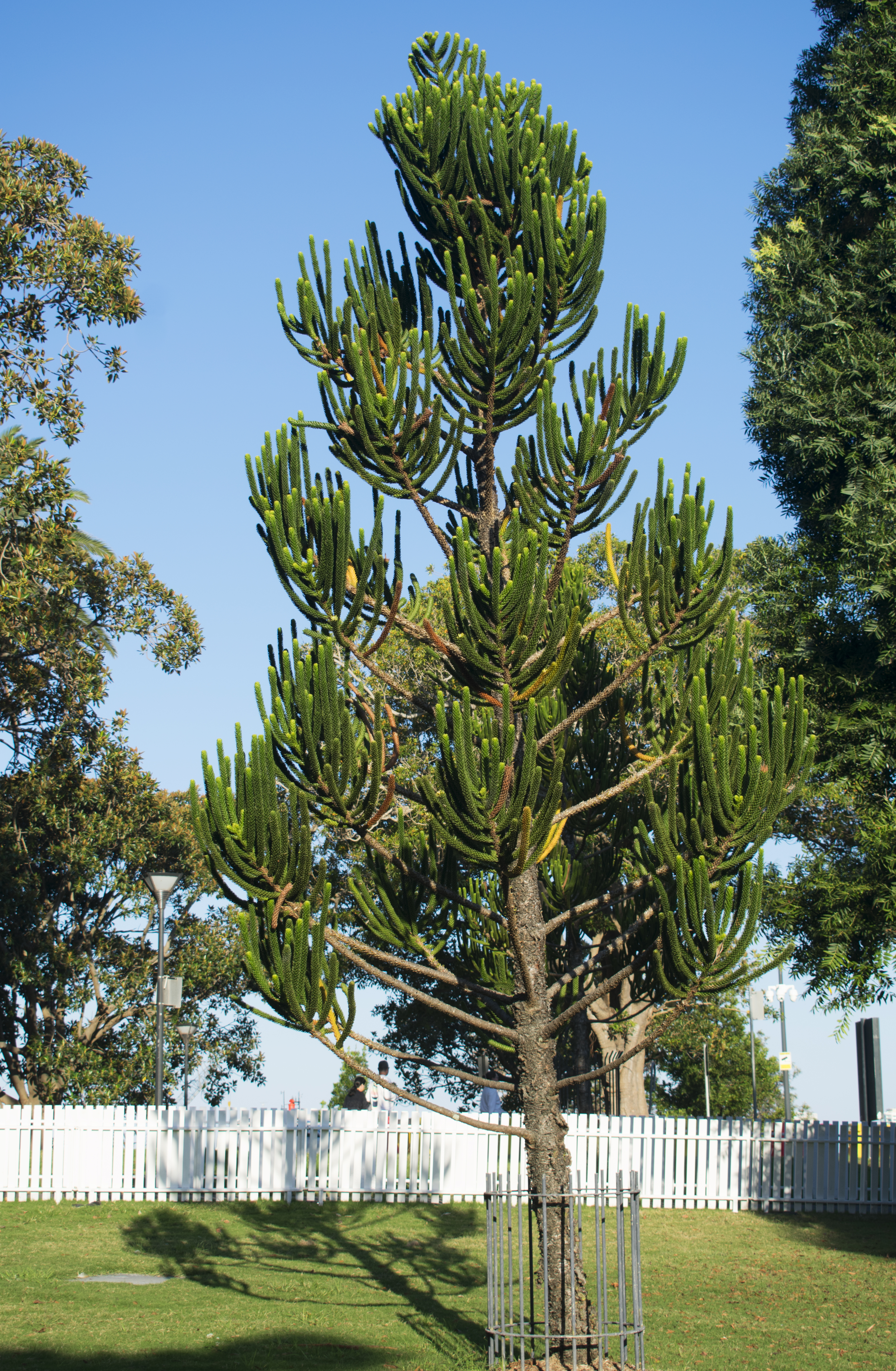
Cultivated tree in Sydney

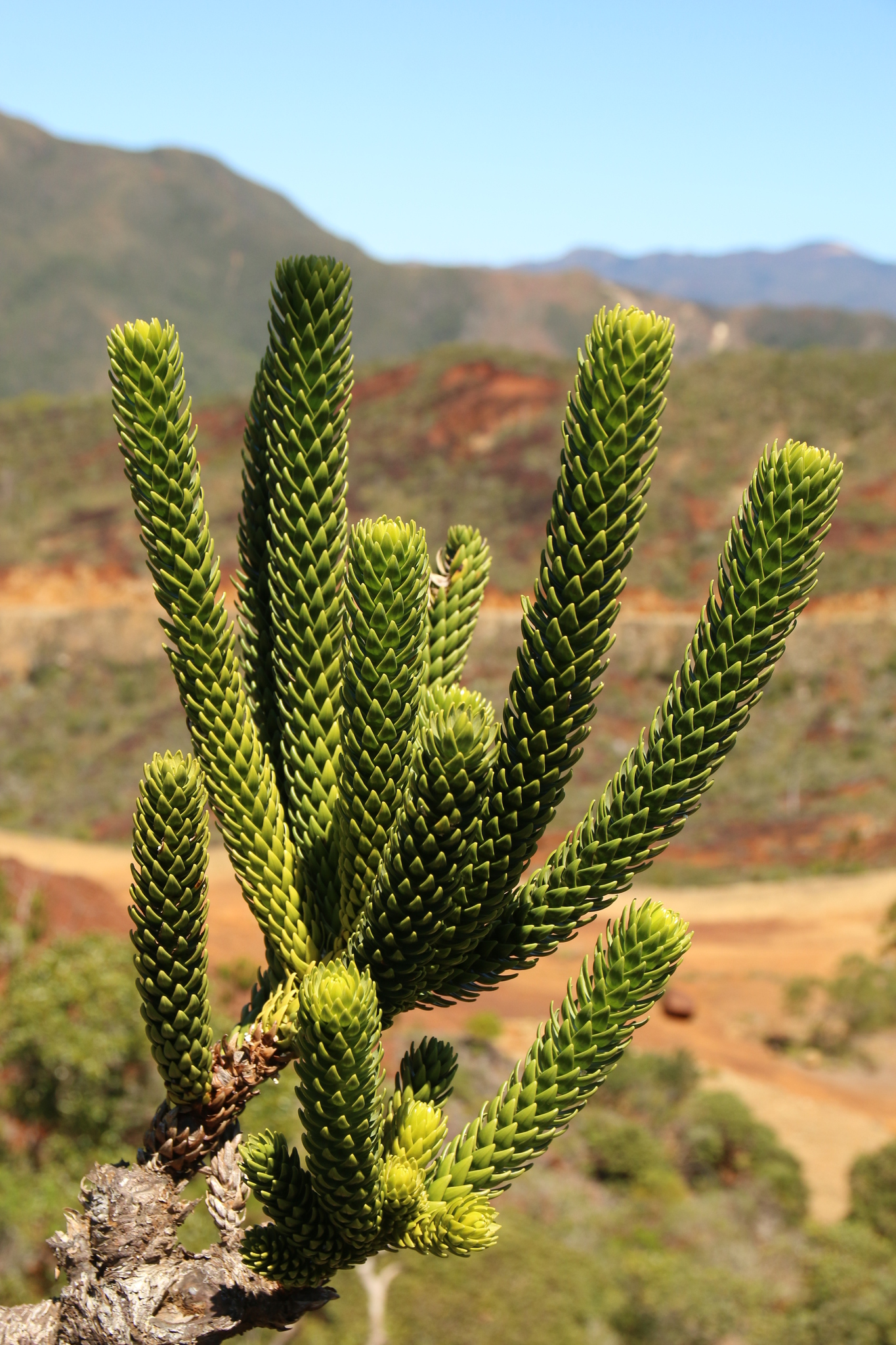
Foliage, at Poro, New Caledonia
