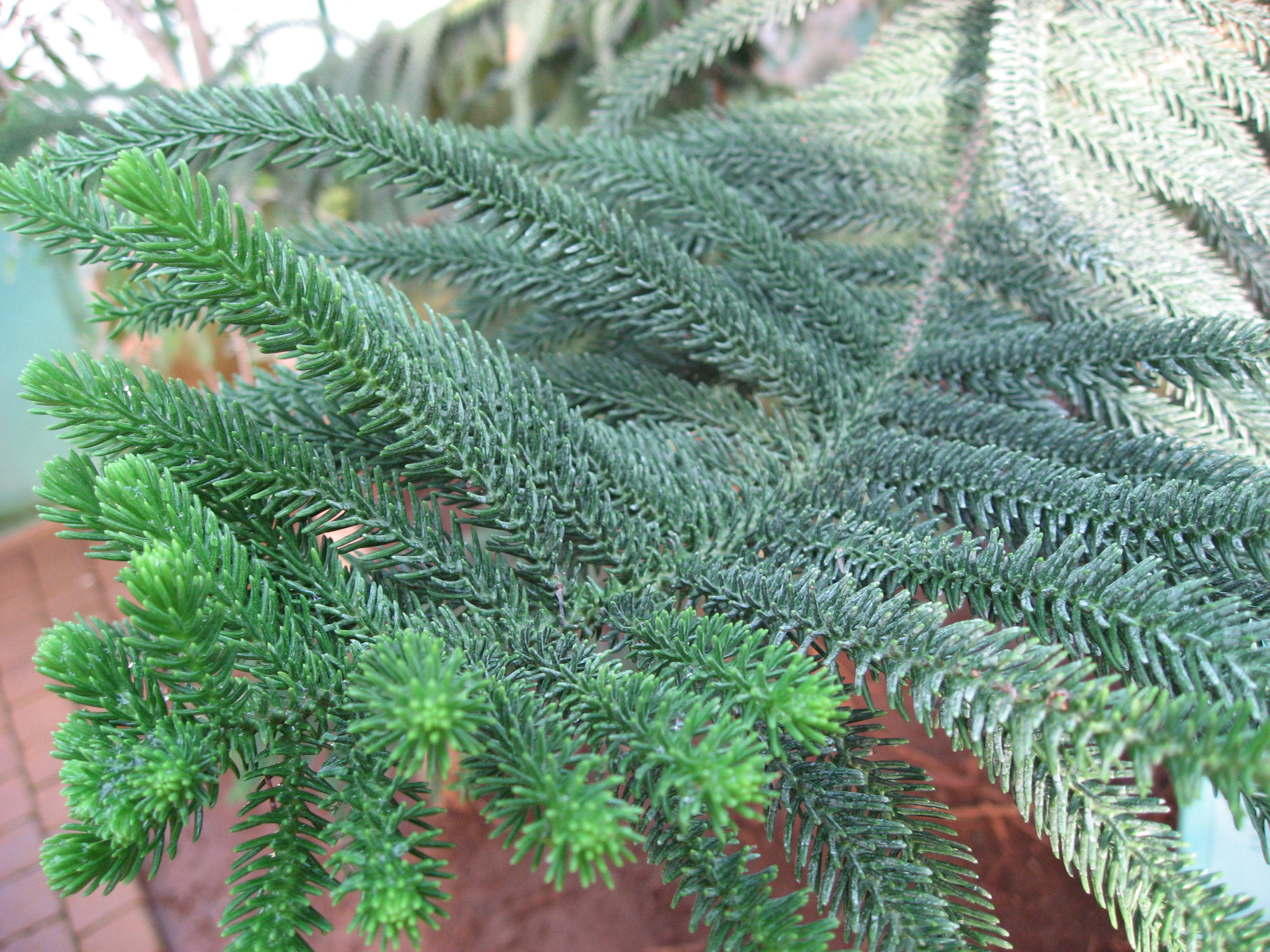

Conservation status
- Endangered (IUCN 3.1)

Scientific classification
- Kingdom: Plantae
- Clade: Tracheophytes
- Clade: Gymnosperms
- Division: Pinophyta
- Class: Pinopsida
- Order: Araucariales
- Family: Araucariaceae
- Genus: Araucaria
- Section: A. sect. Eutacta
- Species: A. luxurians

Binomial name
- Araucaria luxurians (Brongn. & Gris) de Laub.

= Araucaria luxurians =

Species of conifer

Araucaria luxurians is a species of conifer in the family Araucariaceae. It is known by the common names Sapin de Noël and Coast araucaria. It is endemic to New Caledonia, where it grows in several small subpopulations. It grows in ultramafic soils in humid forests and on cliffs and slopes. It is threatened by habitat loss and none of the subpopulations are in protected areas.

This species is a tree growing up to 40 meters tall. Mature specimens may have trunks 70 centimeters in diameter. It is conical or pyramidal in form. The bark peels and releases a red exudate. The leaves are variable in shape and size. Most grow in clusters on small branches and at the tips of larger branches. The female cones are about 10 centimeters long and wide. The male pollen-bearing cones are up to 15 centimeters long and grow at the tips of upper branches.

This tree is cultivated as an ornamental on New Caledonia. It has an attractive conical growth habit similar to the more common Norfolk Island pine, but with lusher foliage, which makes it popular as a Christmas tree in New Caledonia. However outside of New Caledonia, Araucaria luxurians is rarely encountered outside of botanical gardens and other specialised collections, due to New Caledonia's strict export laws.
