= Trounson Kauri Park =

Protected area in New Zealand

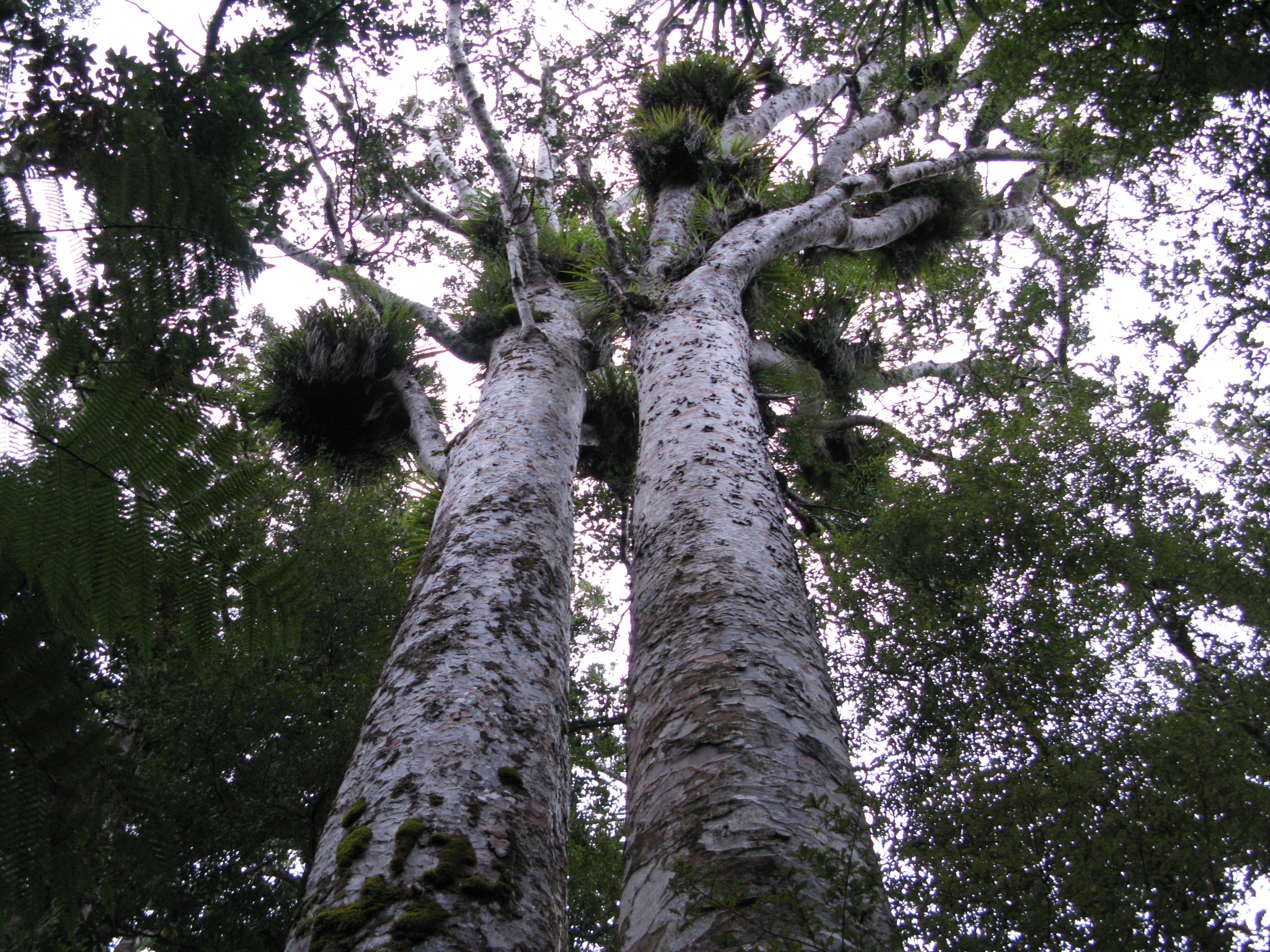
- Kauri trees in Trounson park
- Interactive map of Trounson Kauri Park
- Location: Northland, New Zealand
- Coordinates: 35.7199752°S 173.6493761°E
- Opened: 1921

Trounson Kauri Park is a 586 hectares (1,450 acres) reserve. It was the Department of Conservation's first mainland island in the Northland Region of New Zealand. Characterised by its kauri trees, it was named after James Trounson, who gifted the forest to the Department of Conservation.

Trounson Kauri Park forms a discrete area of native bush set within a rolling rural landscape and rises to a maximum height of some 300 metres. Although not prominent from within the wider landscape, the scale of the vegetation, most notably the kauri accentuates this feature.

Trounson kauri Park includes the catchments of several first order streams of a tributary of the Waima Stream.

== History ==
Trounson Kauri Park and its surrounding farmland was heavily felled. Many people wanted the scenic remnants of kauri to be preserved. In the 1890s, a 3.34-hectare (8.3-acre) stand of kauri forest 36 kilometres (22 mi) north of Dargaville was reserved. Sawmiller James Trounson gifted a further 22 hectares (54 acres) and then sold 364 hectares (900 acres). Trounson Kauri Park was opened in 1921. Since 1995 it has been run as a 'Mainland Island'. An intensive pest control programme is restoring its biodiversity. Half of Trounson Kauri Park's trees are infected with kauri dieback.

== Flora and fauna ==
Trounson Kauri Park is known for its kauri trees, which are common and increasing in the park. Other trees include rimu, kōwhai, pigeonwood and tōtara.

Native birds such as tūī, New Zealand pigeon, morepork, tomtit and grey warbler are common, whilst rarer birds such as North Island kākā and North Island kōkako persist in small numbers. Brown kiwi have the highest density population in Northland in the park thanks to the removal of most of the populations of rats, common brushtail possum and stoats.

== Climate ==
Climate data for Trounson (1991–2020)
Month	Jan	Feb	Mar	Apr	May	Jun	Jul	Aug	Sep	Oct	Nov	Dec	Year
Mean daily maximum °C (°F)	21.8 (71.2)	22.8 (73.0)	21.5 (70.7)	19.1 (66.4)	16.6 (61.9)	14.4 (57.9)	13.6 (56.5)	14.0 (57.2)	15.3 (59.5)	16.5 (61.7)	17.8 (64.0)	20.2 (68.4)	17.8 (64.0)
Daily mean °C (°F)	17.5 (63.5)	18.3 (64.9)	17.0 (62.6)	15.1 (59.2)	13.2 (55.8)	11.1 (52.0)	10.3 (50.5)	10.6 (51.1)	11.7 (53.1)	12.7 (54.9)	13.9 (57.0)	16.2 (61.2)	14.0 (57.2)
Mean daily minimum °C (°F)	13.1 (55.6)	13.7 (56.7)	12.6 (54.7)	11.2 (52.2)	9.8 (49.6)	7.9 (46.2)	7.1 (44.8)	7.3 (45.1)	8.1 (46.6)	8.9 (48.0)	10.0 (50.0)	12.3 (54.1)	10.2 (50.3)
Average rainfall mm (inches)	90.7 (3.57)	83.8 (3.30)	102.2 (4.02)	114.4 (4.50)	175.5 (6.91)	203.9 (8.03)	238.2 (9.38)	170.9 (6.73)	142.0 (5.59)	117.8 (4.64)	96.0 (3.78)	102.7 (4.04)	1,638.1 (64.49)
Source: NIWA

== See also ==
- List of Kauri Parks in New Zealand
