= Waipoua hila =

Conservation status
- Naturally Uncommon (NZ TCS)

Scientific classification
- Kingdom: Animalia
- Phylum: Arthropoda
- Subphylum: Chelicerata
- Class: Arachnida
- Order: Araneae
- Infraorder: Araneomorphae
- Family: Orsolobidae
- Genus: Waipoua
- Species: W. hila

Binomial name
- Waipoua hila Forster & Platnick, 1985

Species of spider

Waipoua hila is a species of Orsolobidae that is endemic to New Zealand.

== Taxonomy ==
This species was described in 1985 by Ray Forster and Norman Platnick from female specimens collected in Northland. The holotype is stored in Otago Museum.

== Description ==
The female is recorded at 3.04mm in length.

== Distribution ==
This species is only known from Waipoua Forest in Northland, New Zealand.

== Conservation status ==
Under the New Zealand Threat Classification System, this species is listed as "Naturally Uncommon" with the qualifier "Range Restricted".
