= Waipoua toronui =

Conservation status
- Naturally Uncommon (NZ TCS)

Scientific classification
- Kingdom: Animalia
- Phylum: Arthropoda
- Subphylum: Chelicerata
- Class: Arachnida
- Order: Araneae
- Infraorder: Araneomorphae
- Family: Orsolobidae
- Genus: Waipoua
- Species: W. toronui

Binomial name
- Waipoua toronui Forster & Platnick, 1985

Species of spider

Waipoua toronui is a species of Orsolobidae that is endemic to New Zealand.

== Taxonomy ==
This species was described in 1985 by Ray Forster and Norman Platnick from male and female specimens collected in Northland. It is the type species of the Waipoua genus. The holotype is stored in Otago Museum.

== Description ==
The male is recorded at 2.20mm in length whereas the female is 2.32mm. The carapace and abdomen are patterned dorsally.

== Distribution ==
This species is only known from Waipoua Forest in Northland, New Zealand.

== Conservation status ==
Under the New Zealand Threat Classification System, this species is listed as "Naturally Uncommon" with the qualifier "Range Restricted".
