= Siamese Kauri =

Individual tree growing in New Zealand

Coordinates: 36°50′11.44″S 175°33′3.87″E

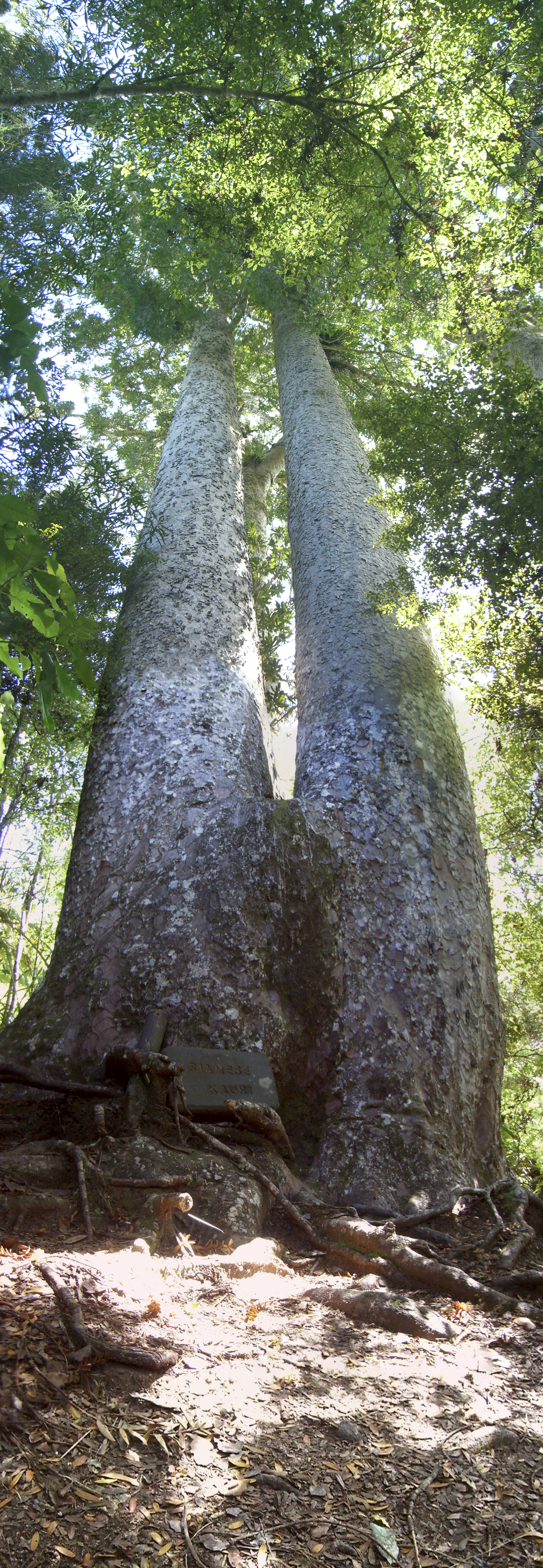
The Siamese Kauri dominates the forest among others of its species in Kauri Grove.

The Siamese Kauri is a kauri tree (Agathis australis) growing in Kauri Grove, about 10 kilometres south of Coromandel township in the north-east of the North Island of New Zealand. The tree gains its name from the conjoined lower trunk that the two trees share. It grows in the Kauri Grove, one of the few remaining stands of mature kauri on the Coromandel Peninsula. It is about 500 metres off the 309 Road, and is accessed by a 30-minute walking track.

== History ==
The tree began as two separate seedlings. Over the centuries they grew in diameter, and the space between them reduced until eventually the two trees fused at the base. It is not known why the Siamese Kauri, and other trees of the same species in Kauri Grove were never felled, unlike almost all the kauri of the Coromandel Peninsula. One suggestion is that the land was controlled by mining companies that hoped to find gold in the area, and so access to the land was restricted.

During World War II, Kauri Grove was due to be logged by the Government to support the war effort. This met with strong opposition from the residents, who formed one of New Zealand's first conservation groups to save the trees. After much opposition to the plans, the message came from the capital that "logging will cease forthwith".
