= Waipoua totara =

Conservation status
- Data Deficit (NZ TCS)

Scientific classification
- Kingdom: Animalia
- Phylum: Arthropoda
- Subphylum: Chelicerata
- Class: Arachnida
- Order: Araneae
- Infraorder: Araneomorphae
- Family: Orsolobidae
- Genus: Waipoua
- Species: W. totara

Binomial name
- Waipoua totara (Forster, 1956)

Synonyms
- Pounamua totara

Species of spider

Waipoua totara is a species of Orsolobidae that is endemic to New Zealand.

== Taxonomy ==
This species was described as Pounamua totara in 1956 by Ray Forster from a male specimen collected in Rangitikei. In 1985, it was moved into Waipoua. The holotype is stored in Canterbury Museum.

== Description ==
The male is recorded at 1.75mm in length. The carapace and abdomen are patterned dorsally.

== Distribution ==
This species is only known from Pohangina Valley in Rangitikei, New Zealand.

== Conservation status ==
Under the New Zealand Threat Classification System, this species is listed as "Data Deficient" with the qualifiers of "Data Poor: Size", "Data Poor: Trend" and "One Location".
