= Waipoua insula =

Conservation status
- Naturally Uncommon (NZ TCS)

Scientific classification
- Kingdom: Animalia
- Phylum: Arthropoda
- Subphylum: Chelicerata
- Class: Arachnida
- Order: Araneae
- Infraorder: Araneomorphae
- Family: Orsolobidae
- Genus: Waipoua
- Species: W. insula

Binomial name
- Waipoua insula Forster & Platnick, 1985

Species of spider

Waipoua insula is a species of Orsolobidae that is endemic to New Zealand.

== Taxonomy ==
This species was described in 1985 by Ray Forster and Norman Platnick from a female specimen collected on Poor Knights Islands. The holotype is stored in Otago Museum.

== Description ==
The female is recorded at 1.63mm in length. The carapace and abdomen are patterned dorsally.

== Distribution ==
This species is only known from Poor Knights Islands, New Zealand.

== Conservation status ==
Under the New Zealand Threat Classification System, this species is listed as "Naturally Uncommon" with the qualifier "Island Endemic" and "One Location".
