= Te Matua Ngahere =

Large individual kauri tree in New Zealand

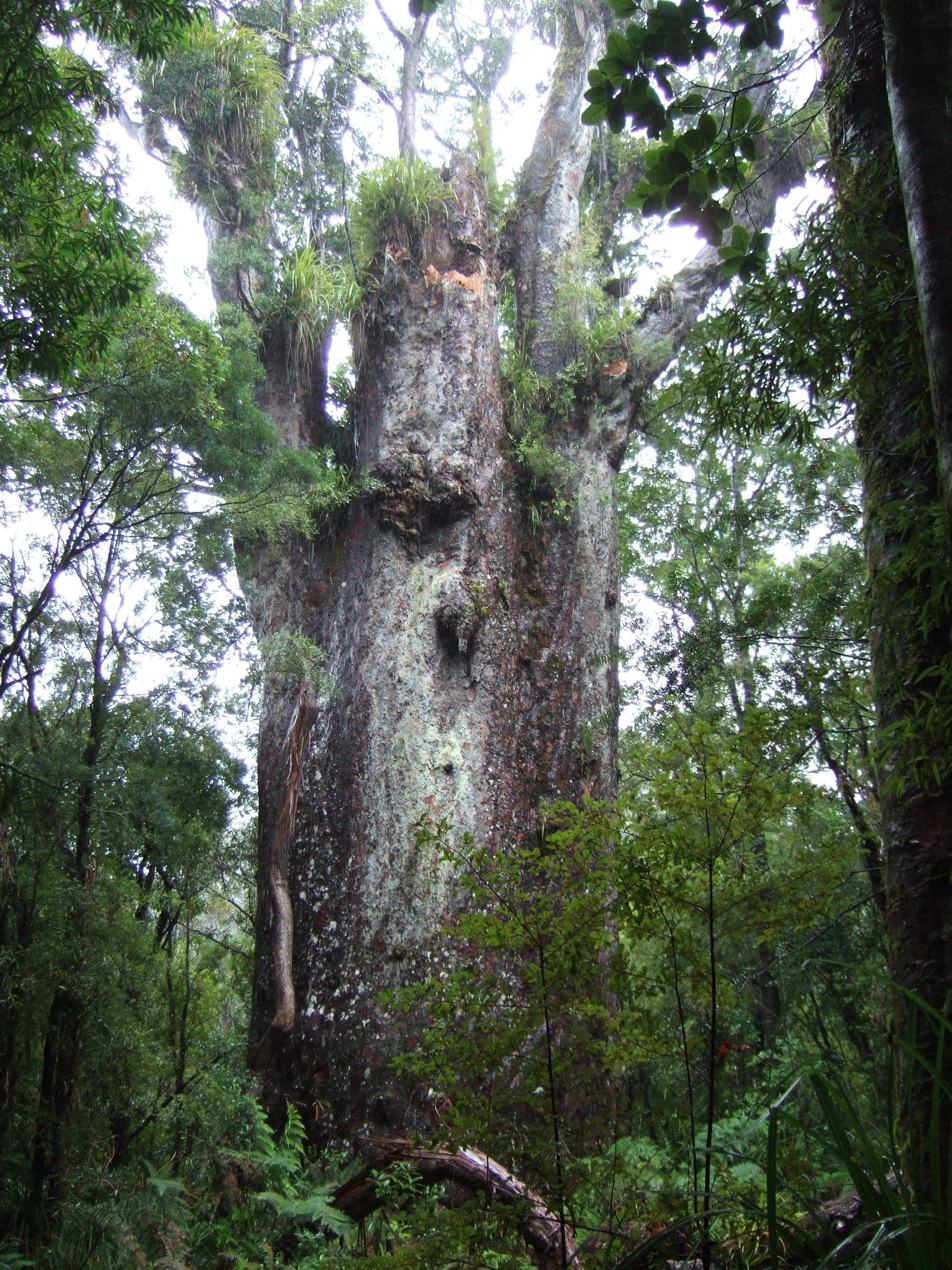
- Te Matua Ngahere as of 2008

- Location within New Zealand
- Species: Kauri (Agathis australis)
- Location: Waipoua Forest, New Zealand
- Coordinates: 35°36′27″S 173°31′43″E
- Height: 29.9 m (98 ft)
- Girth: 16.41 m (53.8 ft)
- Volume of trunk: 208.1 m^{3} (7,350 ft^{3})

Te Matua Ngahere is a giant kauri (Agathis australis) coniferous tree in the Waipoua Forest of Northland Region, New Zealand. The tree's Māori name means "Father of the Forest". Although not as massive or tall as its neighbour Tāne Mahuta, Te Matua Ngahere is stouter, with a girth just over 16 metres (52 ft). It is believed to be the second largest living kauri tree, and to have the biggest girth of any tree in New Zealand.

As there is no means of reliably measuring the tree's age, it has been variously estimated to be between 1,200 and 2,000 years old; or between 2,000 and 3,000 years old; or even 4,000 years old. One resource, published by National Geographic Books, claims that Te Matua Ngahere may be the oldest tree in New Zealand, while another suggests that it is the oldest rainforest tree on Earth.

Greatly revered by the Māori, Te Matua Ngahere is watched over by many local Māori Guardians. The tree, a remnant of the ancient rainforest that once grew on the North Auckland Peninsula, has a relationship with other flora, such as orchids, clubmoss, and a rata tree that grew on it. In July 2007, the Te Matua Ngahere suffered severe damage due to extreme winter storms in Northland when the rata, which was growing on top of Te Matua Ngahere, was felled by strong storm winds, and took with it the central leader of Te Matua Ngahere plus several of its branches, thus shortening its expected lifespan by hundreds of years.

== History ==
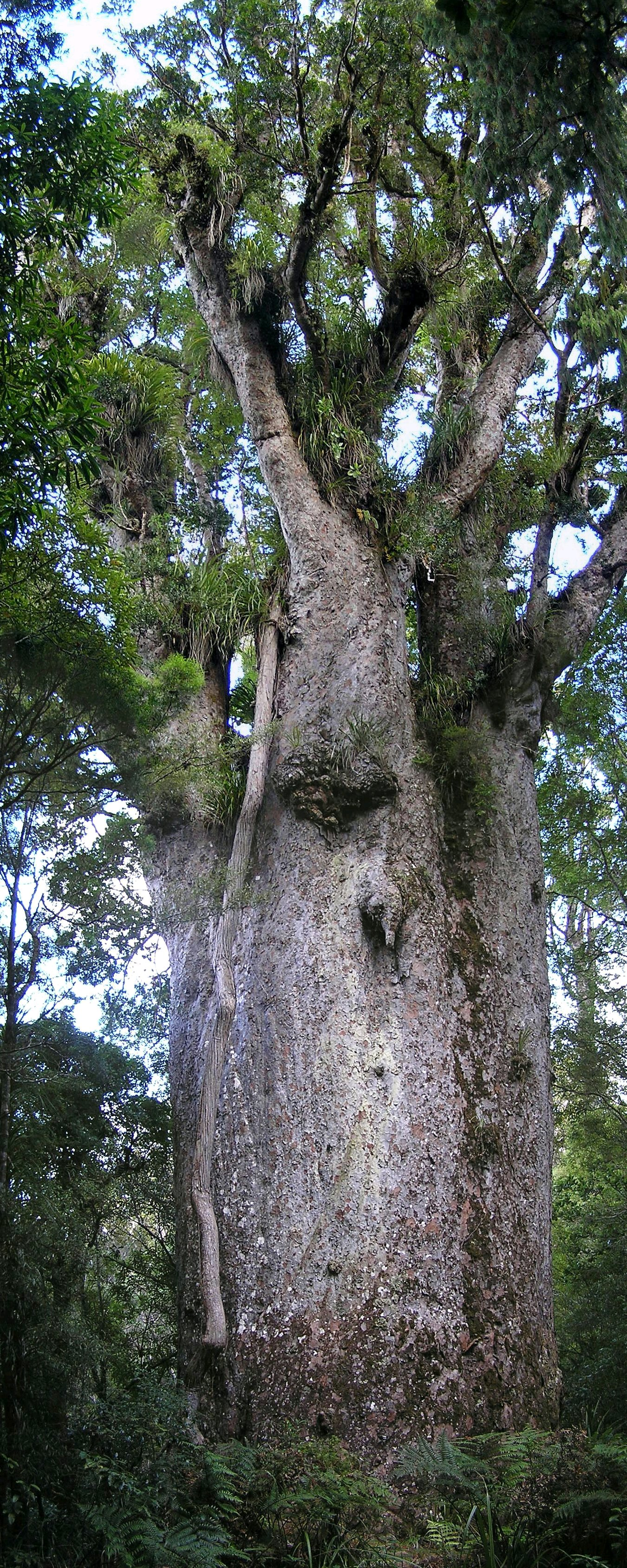
Kauri tree Te Matua Ngahere (Father of the Forest) at Waipoua Forest (Northland, New Zealand). Photograph taken before the 2007 storm damage.

The ancient tree is considered to be a natural heritage of New Zealand. It is generally considered to be over 1500 years old, and was first discovered in February 1937. Forest conservationists estimate that such trees live for about 4000 years, but the life span of Te Matua Ngahere should shorten due to the damage from the 2007 storm winds. This storm also resulted in the fallen rata tree and other plants which are expected to provide excellent clues to the scientific ecological study of the fallen wood and plants.

== Geography ==
The Te Matua Ngahere is situated in the Waipoua forest reserve, next to contiguous forest tracts of Mataraua and Waima, an area of international significance. These forests are within the largest residual region of the native forests in Northland of New Zealand. The nearest populated place is Wekaweka at a distance of 25.2 kilometres (15.7 mi).

The tree is well situated in an open space clearing. It is approached from State Highway 12 through the Waipoua Forest up to the car park, close to the site of the tree. From this point, a winding walk of about 20 minutes along a well-maintained track, surfaced with boardwalks, has marked signs leading directly to the Te Matua Ngahere. The boardwalks protect tree roots from being subjected to human feet. As the roots of the kauri tree are sensitive to frequent trampling by foot, it is advisable to avoid walking over the roots to ensure the long life of the trees.

The walk through the tract gives an educative exposure to the rich variety of tree species of genuine kauri, mixed podocarp, and several varieties of plants. The plants that are seen in abundance belong to the kauri grass, kiekie, neinei and ferns. A viewing tower provides excellent vistas of the rich forest cover. This ancient tree is stated to be the mother of 50 species of trees which grow on it. The largest tree in this forest reserve is Tāne Mahuta, which is named after the Māori god of the forests. It is situated further north of the Te Matua Ngahere. Though very high, it is not as striking as the Te Matua Ngahere which has a larger girth. Nearby is a cluster of four trees growing close together known as "Four Sisters".

Waipoua forest reserve

The largest kauris and the largest area of intact kauri forest are found in the Waipoua forest. Waipoua forest was declared a sanctuary in 1952 to stop logging operations. It is stated to be the largest remnant of the extensive kauri forests of northern New Zealand. It is here that Te Matua Ngahere is located. An 18 kilometres (11 mi) road runs through the forest passing medium-sized mature kauri 40 metres (130 ft) high 5 metres (16 ft) girth trees. A toatoa point here provides excellent views of the forest. The Park Visitor Information Centre disseminates information on the "Kauri trees, gum industry and native birds and other wild life." The car park from where the Te Matua Ngahere could be approached through a track is about 8 kilometres (5.0 mi) from the Visitor Information Centre.

== Measurements ==
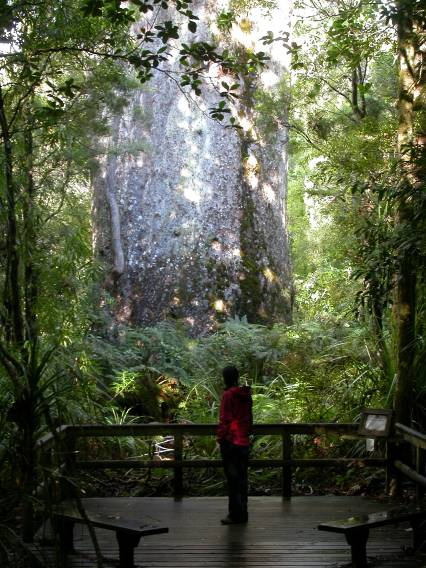
Person standing on viewing platform about 10 m in front of the trunk

The reticulated trunk, which is about 16.41/pi or 5.2 metres (17 ft) in diameter, hardly tapers an inch in the area between a man's chest height and the next 10 metres, although some books may confuse these figures (e.g. 50 feet.). With an estimated volume of 208.1 m^{3} (7,350 ft^{3}), it is stated to have the second biggest trunk by volume; however, the biggest tree by volume is the Tāne Mahuta, which is also in the Waipoua Forest with a volume of 244 m^{3} (8,600 ft^{3}). Its measurements are listed in the table below.

Trunk girth	16.41 m (53.8 ft)
Trunk height	10.21 m (33.5 ft)
Total height	29.9 m (98 ft)
Trunk volume	208.1 m^{3} (7,350 ft^{3})

Important note: all the measurements above were taken in 1971. The most recent measurements may be found on the New Zealand Tree Register.

== Tourism ==
The tree attracts about 50,000 visitors every year. To help prevent the spread of the kauri dieback disease, Phytophthora agathidicida, tourists must clean their footwear at a wash station before and after visiting the bush, and keep to the tracks.

== See also ==
- Agathis australis
- List of individual trees
- List of oldest trees
