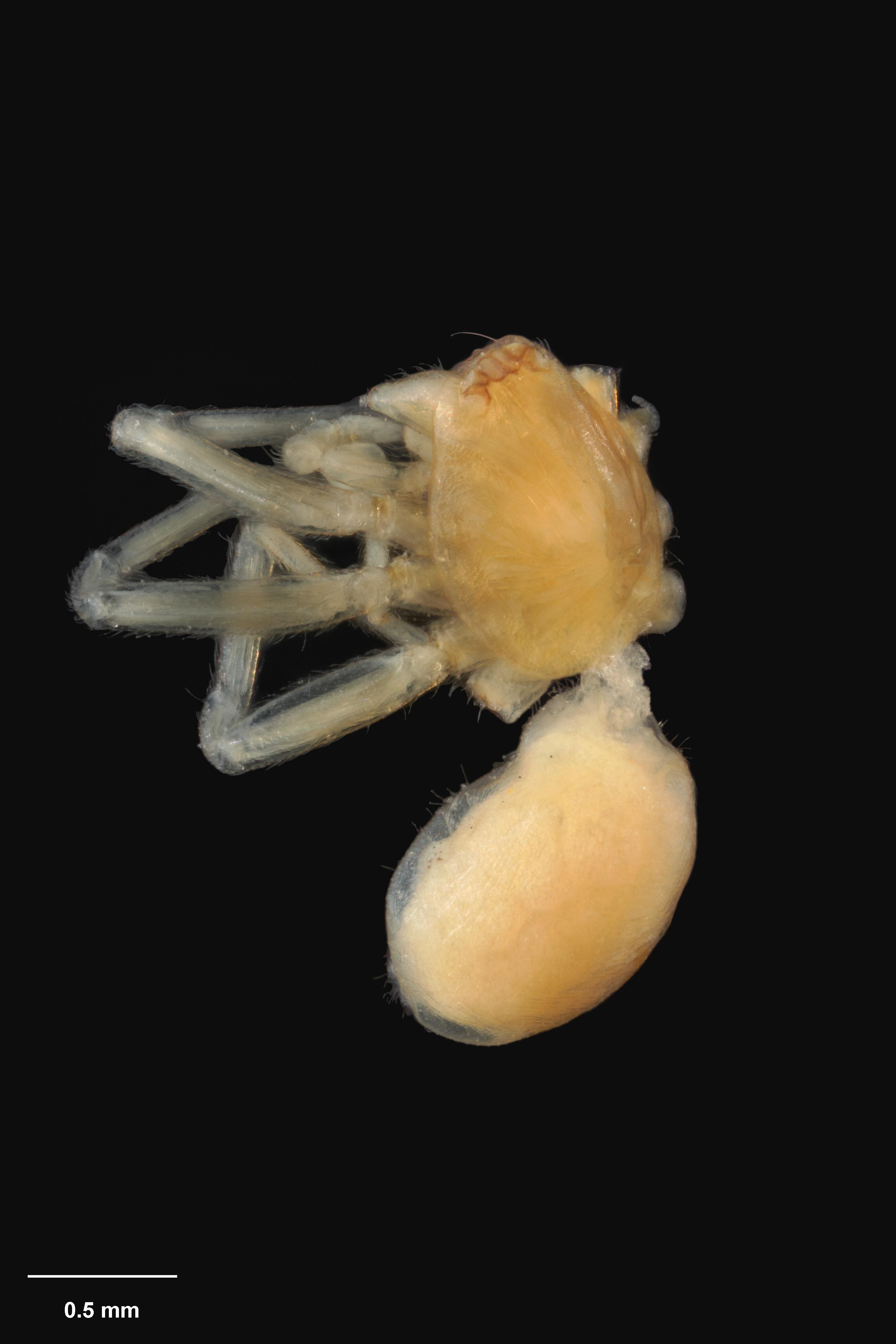
- Waipoua gressitti (Forster, c.1964)

Scientific classification
- Kingdom: Animalia
- Phylum: Arthropoda
- Subphylum: Chelicerata
- Class: Arachnida
- Order: Araneae
- Infraorder: Araneomorphae
- Family: Orsolobidae
- Genus: Waipoua; Forster & Platnick, 1985

Type species
- W. toronui Forster & Platnick, 1985

Species
- 8, see text

= Waipoua (spider) =

Genus of spiders

Waipoua is a genus of Polynesian araneomorph spiders in the family Orsolobidae, and was first described by Raymond Robert Forster & Norman I. Platnick in 1985.

== Species ==
As of June 2019 it contains eight species, found only in New Zealand:

- Waipoua gressitti (Forster, 1964) – New Zealand (Campbell Is.)
- Waipoua hila Forster & Platnick, 1985 – New Zealand
- Waipoua insula Forster & Platnick, 1985 – New Zealand
- Waipoua montana Forster & Platnick, 1985 – New Zealand
- Waipoua otiana Forster & Platnick, 1985 – New Zealand
- Waipoua ponanga Forster & Platnick, 1985 – New Zealand
- Waipoua toronui Forster & Platnick, 1985 (type) – New Zealand
- Waipoua totara (Forster, 1956) – New Zealand
