= William Roy McGregor =

New Zealand zoologist and conservationist (1894–1977)

William Roy McGregor

William Roy McGregor (8 July 1894 – 1 June 1977) was a New Zealand zoologist and conservationist who was successful in halting forestry in the Waipoua forest and establishing the forest as a protected sanctuary.

== Academic career ==
McGregor was born in Thames, New Zealand on 8 July 1894, the son of a draper. He attended Auckland Grammar School in 1909, and then became a school teacher. In 1918 he was appointed a demonstrator in biology at Auckland University College, and in 1922 became a lecturer in zoology. In 1924 he undertook ecological research into the kauri, a giant tree species native to New Zealand. In the late 1920s he was hired by the State Forest Service as a consultant for the Waipoua forest. In 1929 he paid his own way on an expedition to Australia, New Guinea and what is now Indonesia.

McGregor did not obtain his BSc in Zoology until 1932, by which time he was de facto head of zoology at the university. In 1933 he was formally made lecturer in charge of zoology, and in 1939 became head of the newly formed Zoology department, with a spacious new building for which he had designed the interior layout. The building has been described as "mausoleum-like" by one of McGregor's students. For the rest of his career, he gave most of the zoology lectures based on a traditional curriculum that covered all major aspects of the subject as known at that time, but that was lacking in fieldwork. He built up an excellent zoology museum based around the collection from his 1929 trip. The university did not make him associate professor until 1949 and never made him a full professor. He complained that he had been promised the full professorship if he succeeded in building up the zoology school, as he had, but without effect.

McGregor has been described as "charismatic and forceful in the lecture theatre, but poorly qualified to preside over a scientific discipline that was on the threshold of rapid change. Essentially insecure, he ran the department with a rod of iron, suppressing dissenters and, by and large, discouraging scientific debate".

Notable students of McGregor include Patricia Bergquist.

== Conservation work ==
McGregor was dedicated to conservation of the indigenous flora and fauna of New Zealand. Starting in the 1940s, McGregor launched a campaign to protect the Waipoua kauri forest, giving the status of a sanctuary. He wrote an 80-page illustrated pamphlet on the subject, which proved an effective manifesto for conservation. He said the forest "is not merely unique among the forest types of the world; it is at the same time undoubtedly one of Nature's most splendid achievements". He organised a petition that was signed by 70,000 supporters. His emotional appeals and superior rhetoric were successful in winning the battle. He continued his campaign against forestry in the reserve after retiring in 1960, and founded the New Zealand Conservation Society.

== Legacy ==
McGregor married Kathleen Gladys Dacey in 1920, and they had three daughters and a son. After his first wife's death in November 1954, he remarried in October 1955. He died at Auckland on 1 June 1977.

A giant kauri in Waipoua with diameter 436 cm (14.30 ft) and height 40.8 m (134 ft) is named the "McGregor Kauri" in his honour.

The Waipoua forest sanctuary is now bordered to the south by the 350-hectare (860-acre) Professor W.R. McGregor Reserve.

A species of lizard, Oligosoma macgregori, is named in his honour.

== Bibliography ==
- McGregor, W. R. (William Roy) (1948). The Waipoua forest: the last virgin Kauri forest of New Zealand. Auckland: Abel, Dykes Ltd). p. 80.
