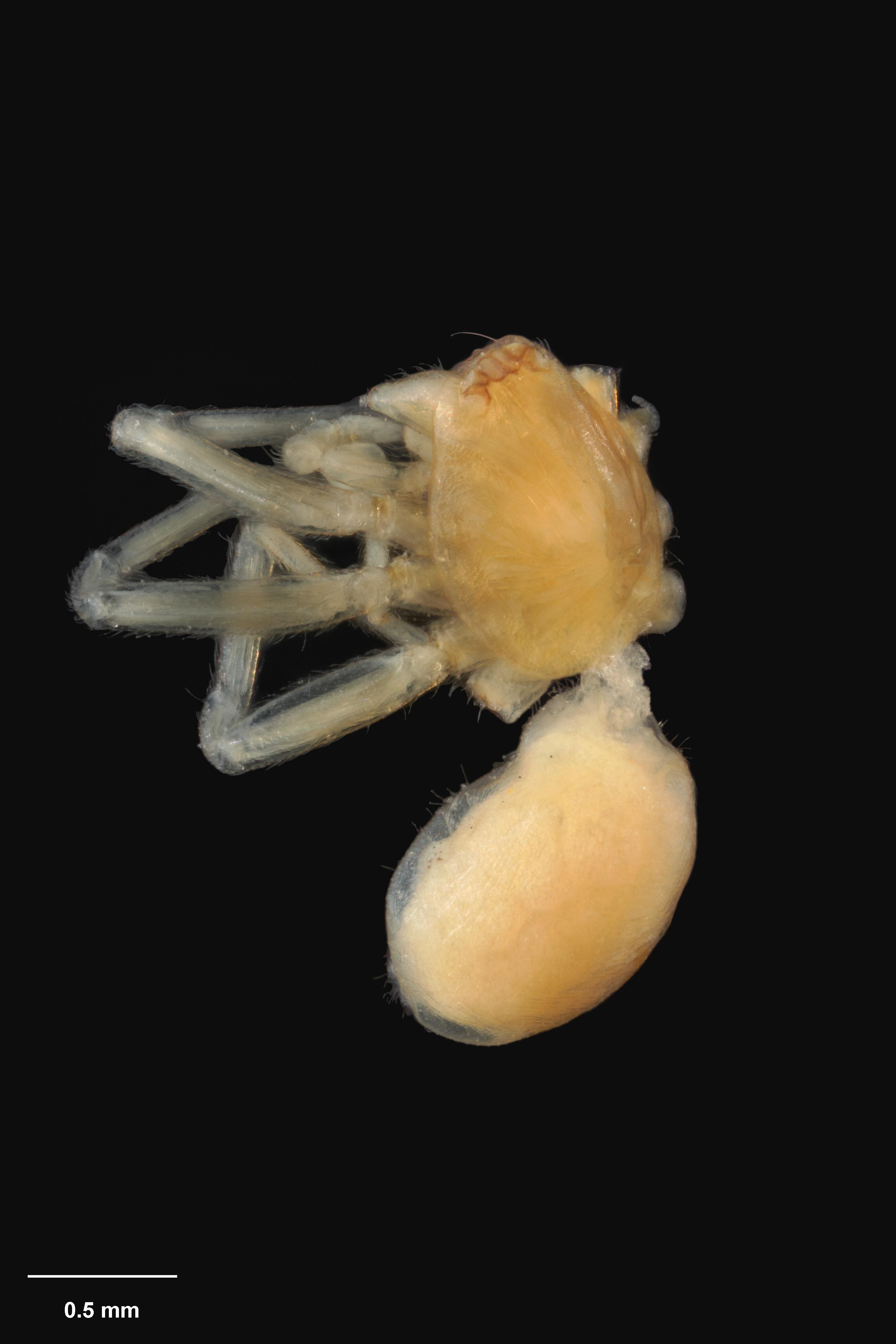

Conservation status
- Naturally Uncommon (NZ TCS)

Scientific classification
- Kingdom: Animalia
- Phylum: Arthropoda
- Subphylum: Chelicerata
- Class: Arachnida
- Order: Araneae
- Infraorder: Araneomorphae
- Family: Orsolobidae
- Genus: Waipoua
- Species: W. gressitti

Binomial name
- Waipoua gressitti (Forster, 1964)

Synonyms
- Pounamua gressitti

= Waipoua gressitti =

Species of spider

Waipoua gressitti is a species of Orsolobidae that is endemic to New Zealand.

== Taxonomy ==
This species was described as Pounamua gressitti in 1964 by Ray Forster from male and female specimens collected in Campbell Island. In 1985, it was moved to Waipoua. The holotype is stored in Te Papa Museum under registration number AS.000034.

== Description ==
The male is recorded at 2.26mm in length whereas the female is 2.47mm. This species has a yellow brown carapace and a purplish abdomen.

== Distribution ==
This species is only known from Campbell Island, New Zealand.

== Conservation status ==
Under the New Zealand Threat Classification System, this species is listed as "Naturally Uncommon" with the qualifiers of "Island Endemic" and "One Location".
