= List of kauri parks in New Zealand =

This is a list of reserves in New Zealand that have been distinguished or treated as kauri parks, being reserves or parks that contain the New Zealand kauri tree, Agathis australis.

== Northland Region ==
- Waipoua Forest, a large forest in western Northland
- Trounson Kauri Park, a forest in Northland
- HB Matthews Reserve, a closed forest as of 2019 to prevent the spread of kauri dieback
- Puketi Kauri Forest, near Kerikeri in eastern Northland
- Omahuta Kauri Forest, next to Puketi Kauri Forest
- Warawara Forest, home to a large number of kauri

== Auckland Region ==
- Waitākere Ranges, home to multiple kauri forests
- Hunua Ranges, large tracts of kauri forests remain intact.
- Cornwall Park, home to a small plantation of kauri, under threat from a growing population of common brushtail possum
- Ngaheretuku Reserve, a closed forest as of 2019 to prevent the spread of kauri dieback
- Kerr-Taylor Reserve, a closed forest as of 2019 to prevent the spread of kauri dieback
- Matuku Reserve, a closed forest as of 2019 to prevent the spread of kauri dieback
- Onetangi Reserve, a closed forest as of 2019 to prevent the spread of kauri dieback
- Kauri Park (reserve), a closed forest as of 2019 to prevent the spread of kauri dieback

== Waikato Region ==
=== Coromandel Peninsula ===
- Waiau Kauri Grove, many kauri are present in this chunk of forest
- Moehau Range, mature kauri are present
- Kauri Block Track, many kauri live here
- Square Kauri, a large kauri forest
- Manaia Forest, a sanctuary for kauri and other flora

=== Elsewhere in the Waikato Region ===
- Hakarimata Range, home to multiple large kauri
