= Tāne Mahuta =

Largest known individual kauri tree

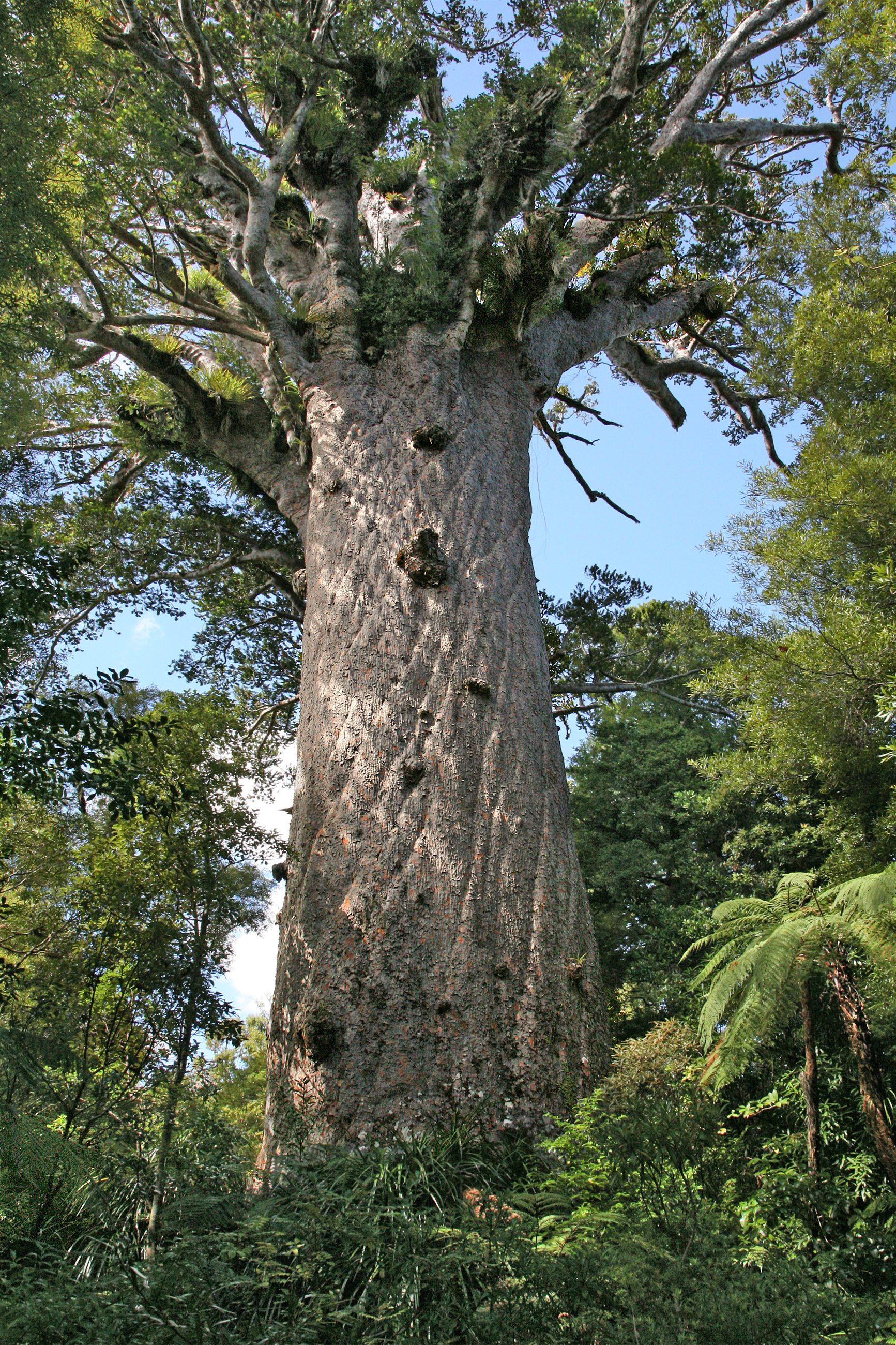
- Tāne Mahuta, the biggest kauri tree alive, in the Waipoua Forest of Northland Region, New Zealand

- Location within New Zealand
- Species: Kauri (Agathis australis)
- Coordinates: 35°36′04″S 173°31′38″E
- Height: 45.2 m (148 ft)
- Girth: 15.44 m (50.7 ft)
- Volume of trunk: 255.5 m^{3} (9,020 ft^{3})
- Date seeded: 500 BC – 750 AD

Tāne Mahuta, also called "God of the Forest", is a giant kauri tree (Agathis australis) in the Waipoua Forest of Northland Region, New Zealand. Its age is unknown but is estimated to be between 1,250 and 2,500 years. It is the largest living kauri tree known to stand today. It is named after Tāne, the Māori god of forests and of birds.

The tree is a remnant of the ancient subtropical rainforest that once grew on the Northland Peninsula. Other giant kauri are found nearby, notably Te Matua Ngahere. Tāne Mahuta is the most famous tree in New Zealand, along with Te Matua Ngahere. It was discovered and identified in early January 1924 when contractors surveyed the present State Highway 12 route through the forest. In 1928, Nicholas Yakas and other bushmen, who were building the road, also identified the tree.

In April 2009, Tāne Mahuta was formally partnered with the tree Jōmon Sugi on Yakushima Island, Japan. During the New Zealand drought of 2013, 10,000 litres of water from a nearby stream was diverted to Tāne Mahuta, which was showing signs of dehydration.

In 2018, the tree was considered threatened by kauri dieback, a generally fatal disease caused by a fungus which has already infected many nearby kauri trees. New Zealand's Department of Conservation initiated a plan to protect and save the tree from kauri dieback.

== Measurements ==
Tree girth	15.44 m (50.7 ft)
Trunk height	17.68 m (58.0 ft)
Tree height	45.2 m (148 ft)
Trunk volume	255 m^{3} (9,000 ft^{3})
Total tree volume	516.7 m^{3} (18,250 ft^{3})

The measurements above were taken in 2002 by Dr. Robert Van Pelt, a forest ecology researcher and affiliate assistant professor at the University of Washington. Former measurements taken in 1971 by the New Zealand Forestry Service may be found on The New Zealand Tree Register.

== Name ==
In 2012, Lady Davina Lewis, daughter of Prince Richard, Duke of Gloucester and Birgitte, Duchess of Gloucester, and her husband, the New Zealander Gary Lewis, named their son Tane Mahuta, after the tree.

== See also ==
- List of individual trees
