= 309 Road =

Road in New Zealand

The 309 Road is a 22-kilometre (14 mi) gravel road between the towns of Coromandel and Whitianga in New Zealand. It winds its way from Coromandel, on the west side of the Coromandel Peninsula, over the ranges to Whitianga, on the eastern side. There are two theories as to how it got its name: one is that there are 309 bends in the road, the other is that horse-drawn coaches used to take 309 minutes to travel it.

Places of interest along the road include Waiau Falls and the Kauri Grove, a stand of mature kauri trees.

== Location ==
| Point | Coordinates (links to map & photo sources) | Notes |
|---|---|---|
| Intersection with Manaia Road, Coromandel | 36.789140°S 175.511713°E | |
| Mid-point | 36.846767°S 175.554208°E | Approximate |
| Intersection with State Highway 25, Tairua-Whitianga Road | 36.858770°S 175.647844°E | |
