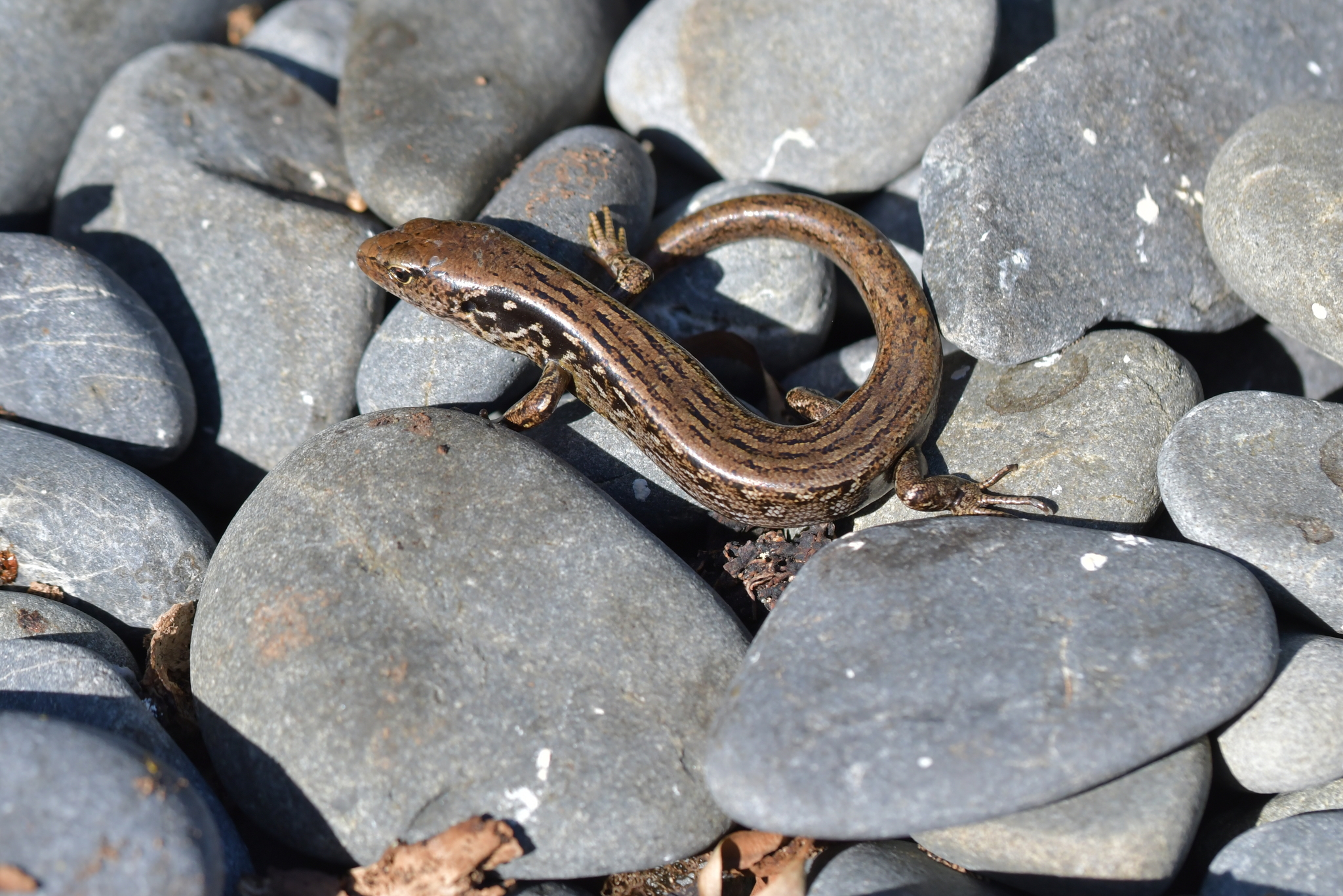

Conservation status
- Vulnerable (IUCN 3.1)

Scientific classification
- Kingdom: Animalia
- Phylum: Chordata
- Class: Reptilia
- Order: Squamata
- Family: Scincidae
- Genus: Oligosoma
- Species: O. macgregori

Binomial name
- Oligosoma macgregori (Robb, 1975)
- Distribution of McGregor's skink on a map of the North Island Known native range

Synonyms
- Leilopisma macgregori Robb, 1975; Cyclodina macgregori — Hardy, 1977; Oligosoma macgregori — Chapple et al., 2009

= Macgregor's skink =

Species of lizard

McGregor's skink (Oligosoma macgregori) is a species of lizard in the subfamily Eugongylinae of the family Scincidae. The species is endemic to New Zealand.

== Etymology ==
The specific name, macgregori, is in honor of New Zealand zoologist William Roy McGregor.

== Geographic range ==
In New Zealand, Oligosoma macgregori was previously found across the North Island. However, it has been heavily impacted by the introduction of rodents, and it is now found in 1% of its former range. Relict populations are on the Cavalli Islands, on Mana Island (following a removal of all pest mammals), and in the North Island at the Hauraki Gulf.

== Description ==
Oligosoma macgregori is a medium-sized lizard species. Maximum recorded snout-to-vent length (SVL) is 112 mm (4.4 in).

== Reproduction ==
Oligosoma macgregori is viviparous.
