= Pigeonwood =

Pigeonwood is a common name for several trees and may refer to:

- Trema (plant), a genus of about 15 species of evergreen trees
- Hedycarya arborea, a tree endemic to New Zealand
