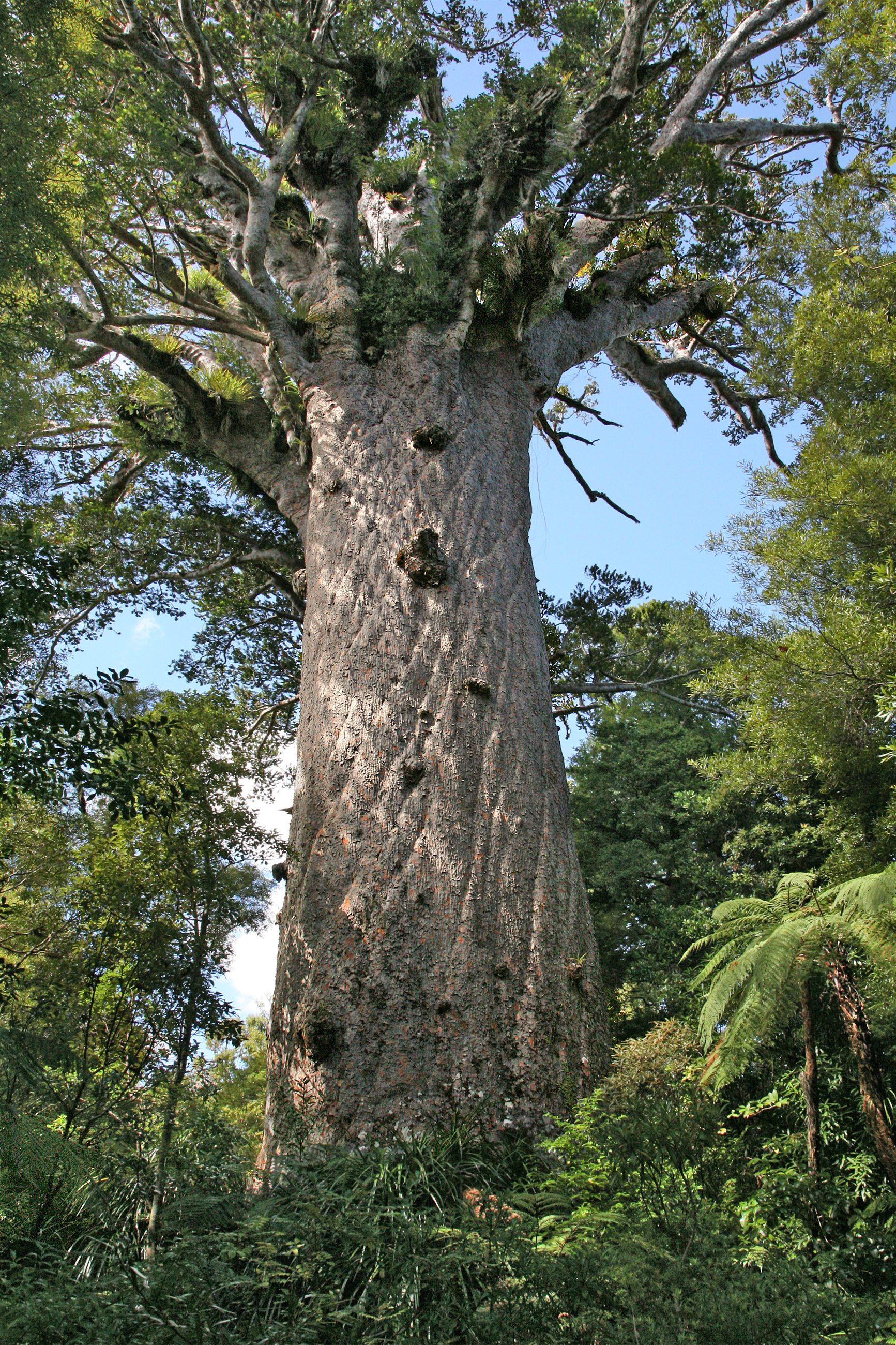

Conservation status
- Nationally Vulnerable (NZ TCS)

Scientific classification
- Kingdom: Plantae
- Clade: Tracheophytes
- Clade: Gymnosperms
- Division: Pinophyta
- Class: Pinopsida
- Order: Araucariales
- Family: Araucariaceae
- Genus: Agathis
- Species: A. australis

Binomial name
- Agathis australis (D.Don) Lindl.
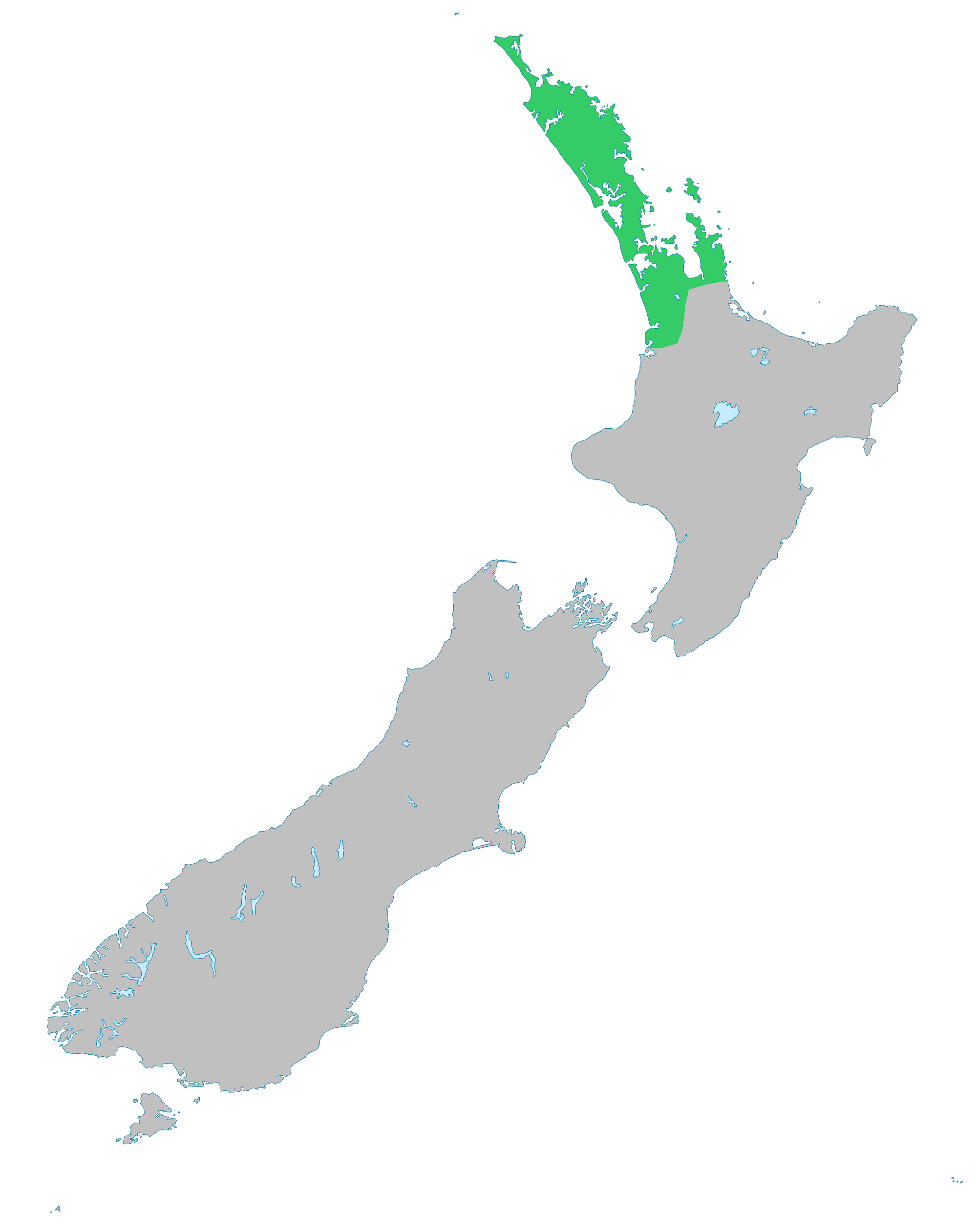
- Natural range of A. australis

Synonyms
- Dammara australis D.Don; Dammara australis var. glauca Gordon; Dammara purpurascens W.Bull; Podocarpus zamiifolius A.Rich.; Salisburyodendron australis (D.Don) A.V.Bobrov & Melikyan

= Agathis australis =

New Zealand kauri Temporal range: Oligocene–Recent

Species of coniferous tree

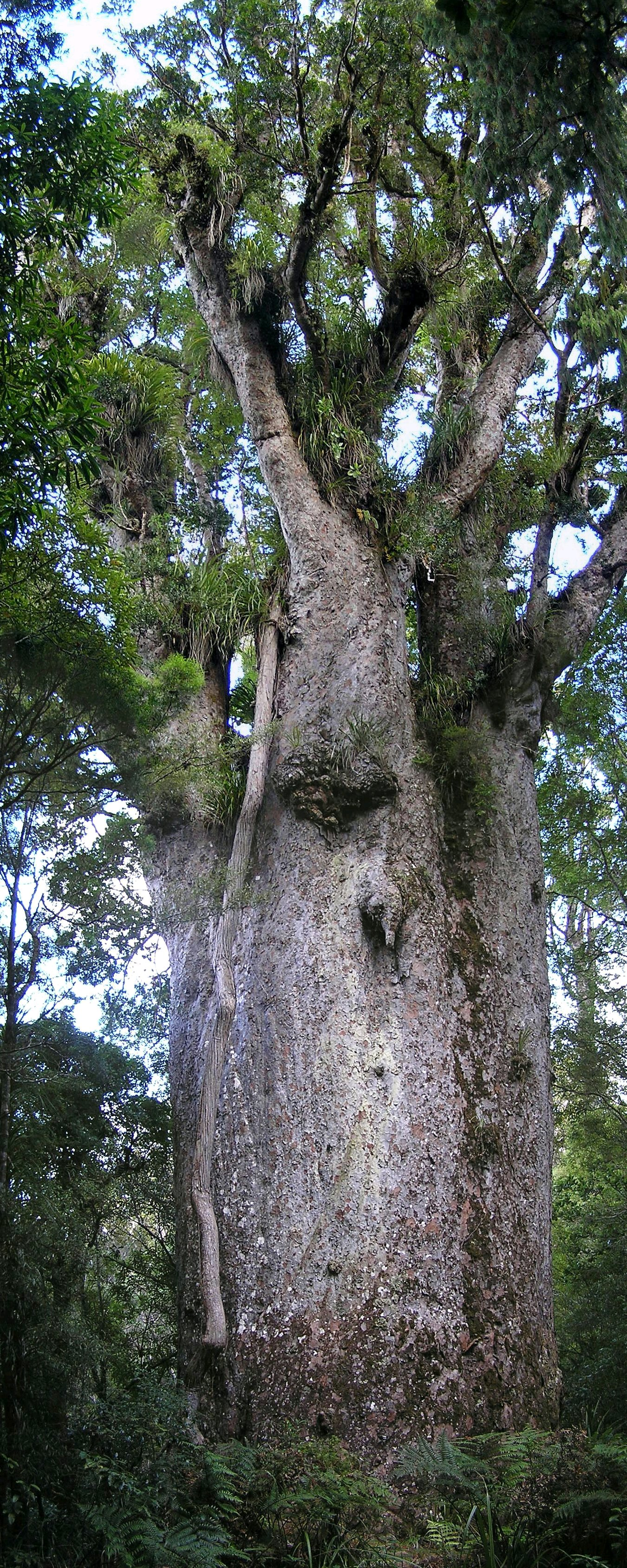
Agathis australis tree 'Te Matua Ngahere'

Agathis australis, the kauri, is a species of coniferous tree in the family Araucariaceae, most commonly found north of 38°S in the northern regions of New Zealand's North Island.

It is the largest (by volume) but not tallest species of tree in New Zealand, standing up to 50 metres (160 ft) tall in the emergent layer above the forest's main canopy. The tree has smooth bark and small narrow leaves. Other common names to distinguish A. australis from other members of Agathis are southern kauri and New Zealand kauri.

With its podsolization capability and regeneration pattern it can compete with faster growing angiosperms. Because it is such a conspicuous species, forest containing kauri is generally known as kauri forest, although kauri need not be the most abundant tree. In the warmer northern climate, kauri forests have a higher species richness than those found further south. Kauri even act as a foundation species that modify the soil under their canopy to create unique plant communities.

== Taxonomy ==
Scottish botanist David Don described the species as Dammara australis. The genus name Agathis is derived from Greek and means 'ball of twine', a reference to the shape of the male cones, which are also known by the botanical term strobili. The specific epithet australis translates in English to 'southern', and was used to distinguish the species from the other members of Agathis, which are typically found in more northern tropical areas.

== Etymology ==
The Māori name is descended from Proto-Polynesian *kauquli, a name used to describe various dark-coloured trees in Polynesian languages, including Samoan ebony, or Diospyros samoensis.

== Description ==
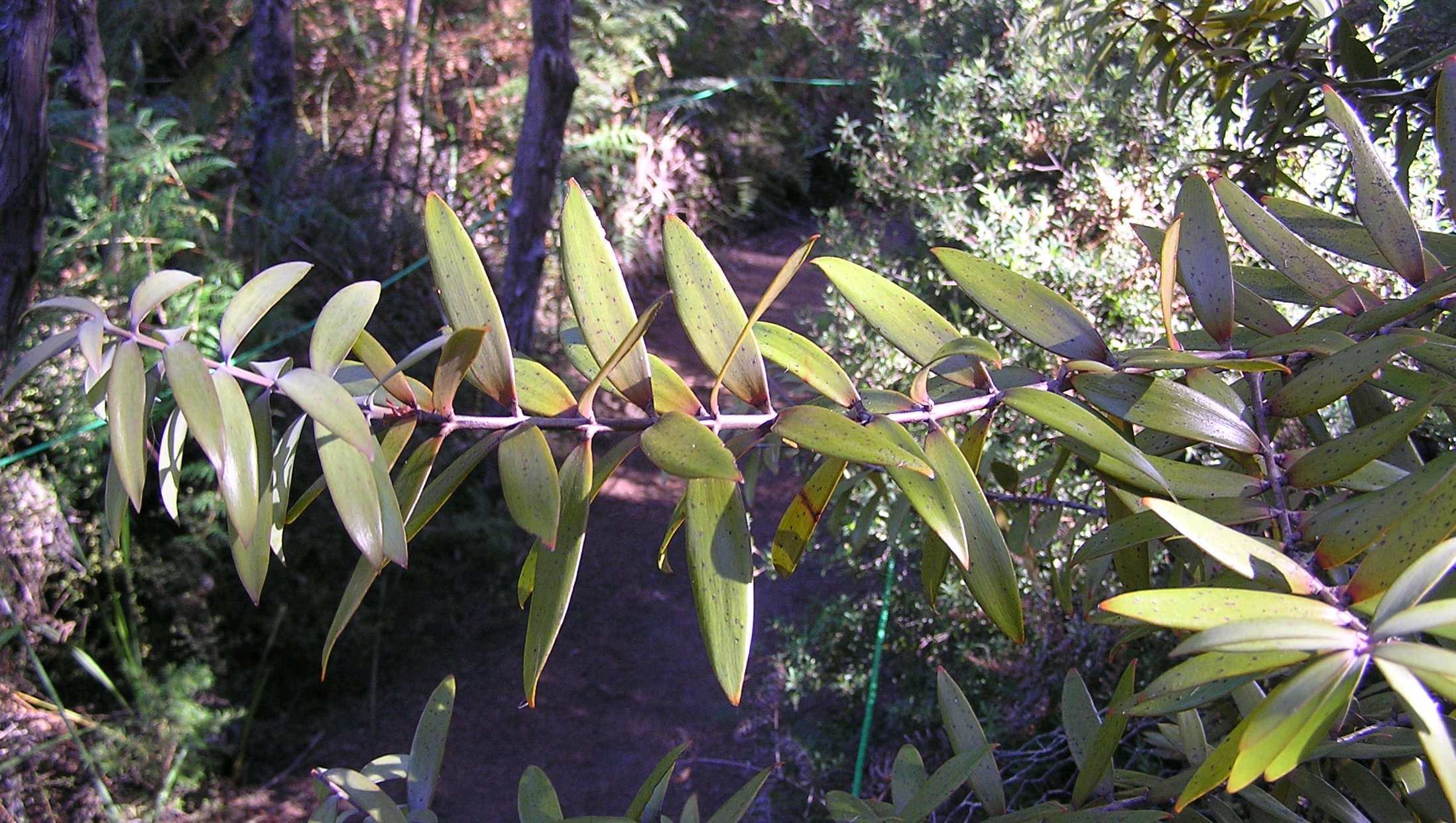
Foliage on a young tree. The foliage of older trees is usually unreachable.

The young plant grows straight upwards and has the form of a narrow cone with branches going out along the length of the trunk. However, as it gains in height, the lowest branches are shed, preventing vines from climbing. By maturity, the top branches form an imposing crown that stands out over all other native trees, dominating the forest canopy.

The flaking bark of the kauri tree defends it from parasitic plants, and accumulates around the base of the trunk. On large trees it may pile up to a height of 2 metres (6 ft 7 in) or more. Kauri often form small clumps or patches scattered through mixed forests.

Kauri leaves are 3–7 centimetres (1.2–2.8 in) long and 1 centimetre (0.39 in) broad, tough and leathery in texture, with no midrib; they are arranged in opposite pairs or whorls of three on the stem. The seed cones are globose, 5–7 centimetres (2.0–2.8 in) diameter, and mature 18 to 20 months after pollination; the seed cones disintegrate at maturity to release winged seeds, which are then dispersed by the wind. A single tree produces both male and female seed cones. Fertilisation of the seeds occurs by pollination, which may be driven by the same or another tree's pollen.

=== Size ===
Agathis australis can attain heights of 40–50 metres (130–160 ft) and trunk diameters big enough to rival Californian sequoias at over 5 metres (16 ft). The largest kauri trees did not attain as much height or girth at ground level but contain more timber in their cylindrical trunks than comparable Sequoias with their tapering stems.

The largest recorded specimen was known as The Great Ghost and grew in the mountains at the head of the Tararu Creek, which drains into the Hauraki Gulf just north of the mouth of the Waihou River (Thames). Thames Historian Alastair Isdale says the tree was 8.54 metres (28.0 ft) in diameter, and 26.83 metres (88.0 ft) in girth. It was consumed by fire in c. 1890.

A kauri tree at Mill Creek, Mercury Bay, known as Father of the Forests was measured in the early 1840s as 22 metres (72 ft) in circumference and 24 metres (79 ft) to the first branches. It was recorded as being killed by lightning in that period.

Another huge tree, Kairaru, had a girth of 20.1 metres (66 ft) and a columnar trunk free of branches for 30.5 metres (100 ft) as measured by a Crown Lands ranger, Henry Wilson, in 1860. It was on a spur of Mt Tutamoe about 30 kilometres (19 mi) south of Waipoua Forest near Kaihau. It was destroyed in the 1880s or 1890s when a series of huge fires swept the area.

Other trees far larger than living kauri have been noted in other areas. Rumors of stumps up to 6 metres (20 ft) are sometimes suggested in areas such as the Billygoat Track above the Kauaeranga Valley near Thames. However, there is no good evidence for these (e.g., a documented measurement or a photograph with a person for scale).

Given that over 90 per cent of the area of kauri forest standing before 1000 AD was destroyed by about 1900, it is not surprising that recent records are of smaller, but still very large trees. Two large kauri fell during tropical storms in the 1970s. One of these was Toronui, in Waipoua Forest. Its diameter was larger than that of Tāne Mahuta and its clean bole larger than that of Te Matua Ngahere, and by forestry measurements was the largest standing. Another tree, Kopi, in Omahuta Forest near the standing Hokianga kauri, was the third largest with a height of 56.39 metres (185.0 ft) and a diameter of 4.19 metres (13.7 ft). It fell in 1973. Like many ancient kauri both trees were partly hollow.

== Growth rate and age ==
In general over the lifetime of the tree the growth rate tends to increase, reach a maximum, then decline. A 1987 study measured mean annual diameter increments ranging from 1.5–4.6 millimetres (0.059–0.181 in) per year with an overall average of 2.3 millimetres (0.091 in) per year. This is equivalent to 8.7 annual rings per centimetre of core, said to be half the commonly quoted figure for growth rate. The same study found only a weak relationship between age and diameter. The growth of kauri in planted and second-growth natural forests has been reviewed and compared during the development of growth and yield models for the species. Kauri in planted forests were found to have up to 12 times the volume productivity than those in natural stands at the same age.

Individuals in the same 10 centimetres (3.9 in) diameter class may vary in age by 300 years, and the largest individual on any particular site is often not the oldest. Trees can normally live longer than 600 years. Many individuals probably exceed 1000 years, but there is no conclusive evidence that trees can exceed 2000 years in age. By combining tree ring samples from living kauri, wooden buildings, and preserved swamp wood, a dendrochronology has been created which reaches back 4,500 years, the longest tree ring record of past climate change in the southern hemisphere. One 1700 year old swamp wood kauri that dates to approximately 42,000 years ago contains fine-scale carbon-14 fluctuations in its rings that may be reflective of the most recent magnetic field flip of the earth.

== Root structure and soil interaction ==
Much like podocarps, it feeds in the organic litter near the surface of the soil through fine root hairs. This layer of the soil is composed of organic matter derived from falling leaves and branches as well as dead trees, and is constantly undergoing decomposition. On the other hand, broadleaf trees such as māhoe derive a good fraction of their nutrition in the deeper mineral layer of the soil. Although its feeding root system is very shallow, it also has several downwardly directed peg roots which anchor it firmly in the soil. Such a solid foundation is necessary to prevent a tree the size of a kauri from blowing over in storms and cyclones.

The litter left by kauri is much more acidic than most trees, and as it decays similarly acidic compounds are liberated. In a process known as leaching, these acidic molecules pass through the soil layers with the help of rainfall, and release other nutrients trapped in clay such as nitrogen and phosphorus. This leaves these important nutrients unavailable to other trees, as they are washed down into deeper layers. This process is known as podsolization, and changes the soil colour to a dull grey. For a single tree, this leaves an area of leached soil beneath known as a cup podsol (de). This leaching process is important for kauri's survival as it competes with other species for space.

Leaf litter and other decaying parts of a kauri decompose much more slowly than those of most other species. Besides its acidity, the plant also bears substances such as waxes and phenols, most notably tannins, that are harmful to microorganisms. This results in a large buildup of litter around the base of a mature tree in which its own roots feed. As with most perennials, these feeding roots also house a symbiotic fungi known as mycorrhiza which increase the plant's efficiency in taking up nutrients. In this mutualistic relationship, the fungus derives its own nutrition from the roots. In its interactions with the soil, kauri is thus able to starve its competitors of much needed nutrients and compete with much younger lineages.

The fungi on kauri are a food source for the larvae of the New Zealand giraffe weevil, Lasiorhynchus barbicornis. The larvae of L. barbicornis burrow into the wood of a tree for up to two years. Then L. barbicornis exit the bark of the tree as a fully formed adult beetle. These adult L. barbicornis exit from trees in Spring and Summer and months. After emerging from the tree, these adult L. barbicornis only live for a few weeks.

== Distribution ==
=== Local spatial distribution ===
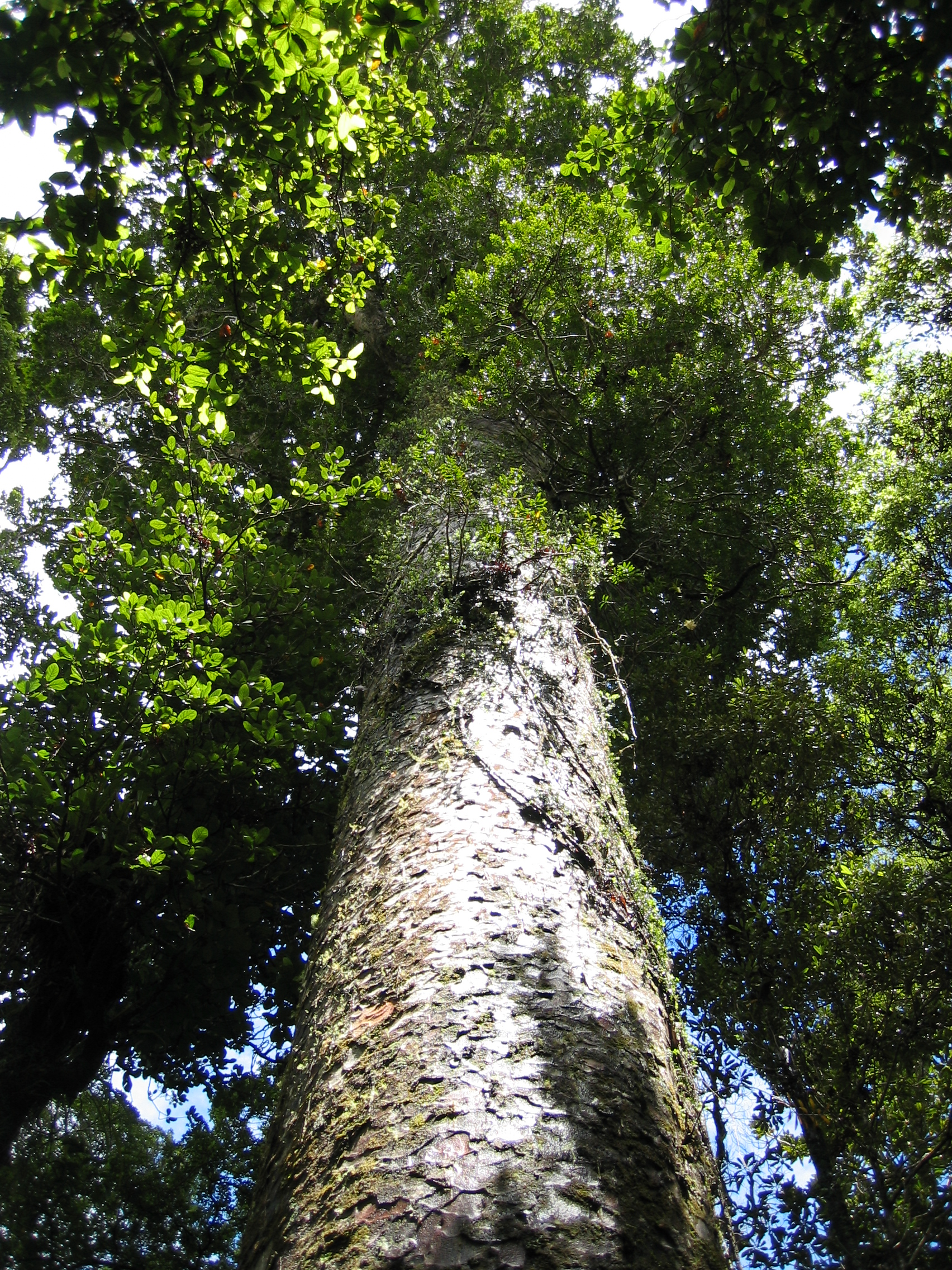
A kauri at Waipoua Forest

In terms of local topography, kauri is far from randomly dispersed. As mentioned above, kauri relies on depriving its competitors of nutrition in order to survive. However, one important consideration not discussed thus far is the slope of the land. Water on hills flows downward by the action of gravity, taking with it the nutrients in the soil. This results in a gradient from nutrient poor soil at the top of slopes to nutrient rich soils below. As nutrients leached are replaced by aqueous nitrates and phosphates from above, the kauri tree is less able to inhibit the growth of strong competitors such as angiosperms. In contrast, the leaching process is only enhanced on higher elevation. In Waipoua Forest this is reflected in higher abundances of kauri on ridge crests, and greater concentrations of its main competitors, such as tarairi, at low elevations. This pattern is known as niche partitioning, and allows more than one species to occupy the same area. Those species which live alongside kauri include tawari, a montane broadleaf tree which is normally found in higher altitudes, where nutrient cycling is naturally slow.

=== Broader habitat, including changes over recent geological time ===
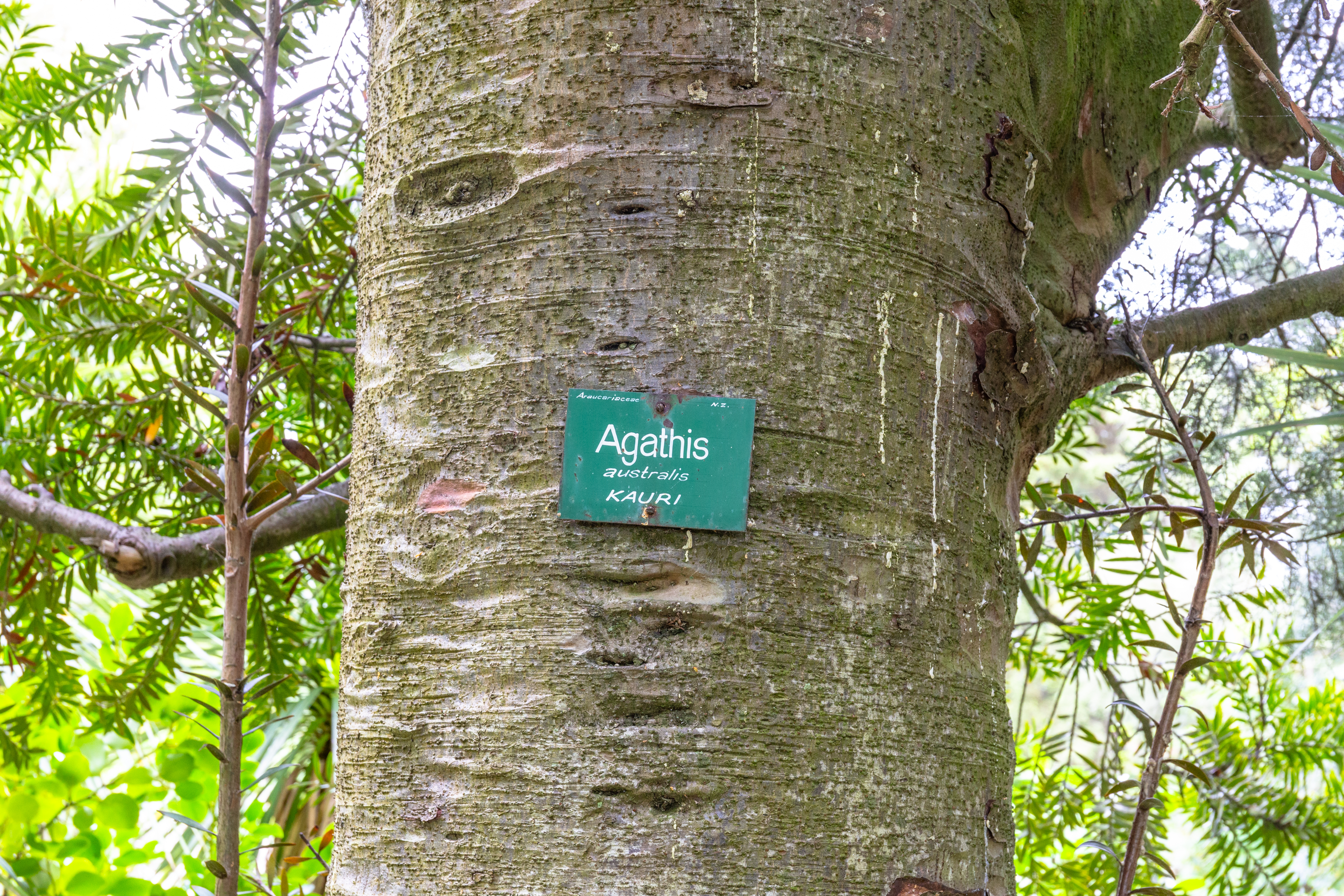
Agathis australis at the Christchurch Botanic Gardens

Kauri is found growing in its natural ecosystem north of 38°S latitude. Its conventional southern limit stretches from the Kawhia Harbour in the west to the eastern Kaimai Range.

However, mature kauri can be found as far south as Christchurch and Dunedin, including in the Dunedin Botanic Gardens.

Its distribution has changed greatly over geological time because of climate change. This is shown in the recent Holocene epoch by the migration of kauri southwards after the peak of the last ice age. During this time, ice sheets covered much of the world's continents, kauri was able to survive only in isolated pockets, its main refuge being in the very far north. is one Scientists have used radiocarbon dating to uncover the history of the tree's distribution, with stump kauri from peat swamps used for measurement. The coldest period in recent times occurred about 15,000 to 20,000 years ago, during which time kauri was apparently confined north of Kaitaia, near the northernmost point of the North Island, North Cape. Kauri requires a mean temperature of 17 °C (63 °F) or more for most of the year. The tree's retreat can be used as a proxy for temperature changes during this period. While not present in modern days, the Aupōuri Peninsula in the far north was a refuge for kauri, as large quantities of kauri gum were present in the soils.

It remains unclear whether kauri recolonised the North Island from a single refuge in the far north or from scattered pockets of isolated stands that managed to survive despite climatic conditions. It spread south through Whangārei, past Dargaville and as far south as Waikato, attaining its peak distribution during the years 3000 BP to 2000 BP. There is some suggestion that it has receded somewhat since then, which may indicate temperatures have declined slightly. During the peak of its movement southwards, it was travelling as fast as 200 metres (660 ft) per year. Its southward spread is relatively rapid for a tree that can take a millennium to reach complete maturity.

=== Reproduction ===
Kauri relies on wind for pollination and seed dispersal, while many other native trees have their seeds carried large distances by frugivores (animals which eat fruit) such as the kererū (native pigeon). However, kauri trees can produce seeds while relatively young, taking only 50 years or so before giving rise to their own offspring. This trait makes them somewhat like a pioneer species, despite the fact that their long lifespan is characteristic of K-selected species. In good conditions, where access to water and sunlight are above average, diameters in excess of 15 centimetres (5.9 in) and seed production can occur inside 15 years.

== Regeneration and life history ==
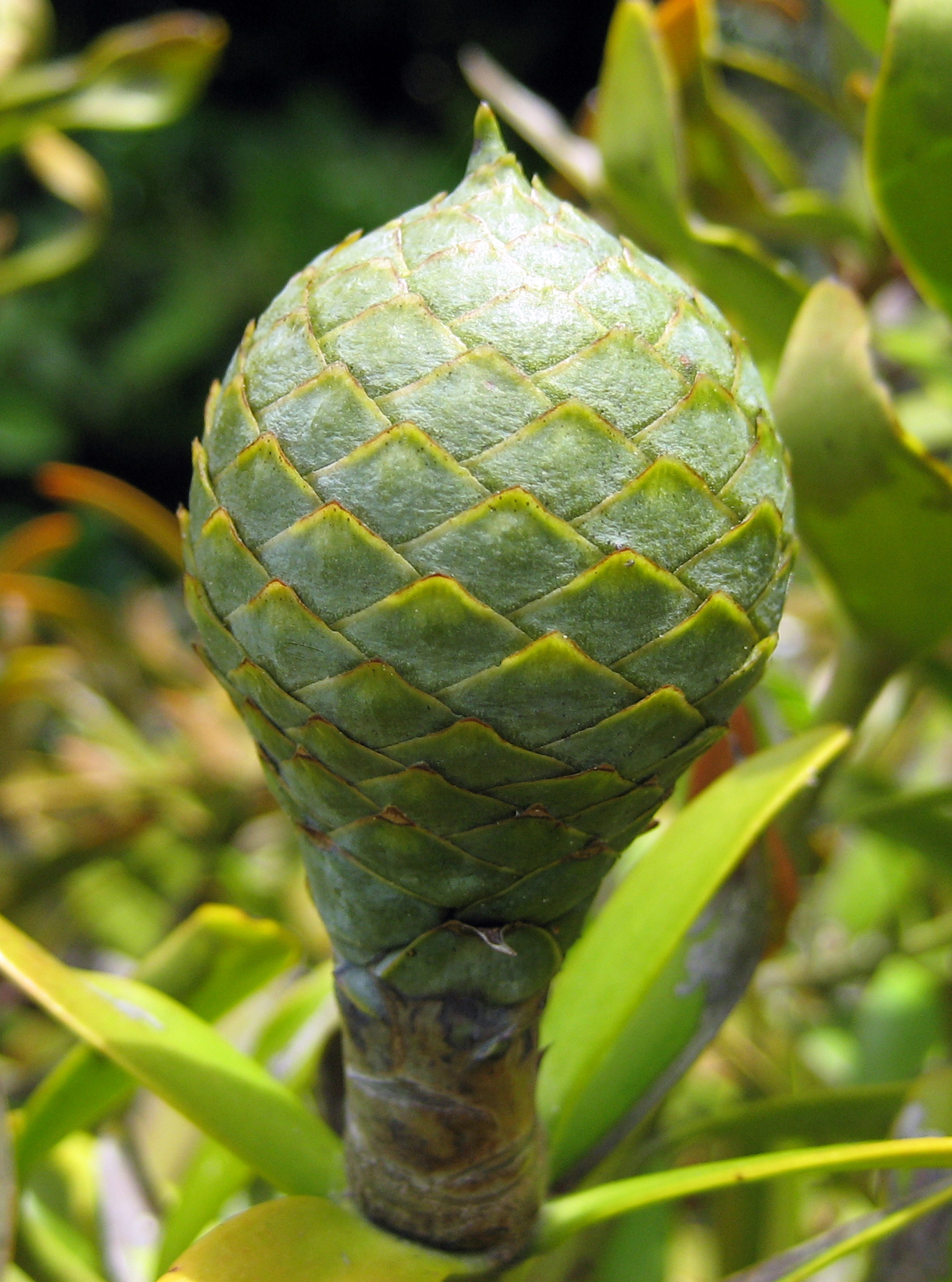
Female cone of Agathis australis, Auckland, New Zealand

Just as the niche of kauri is differentiated through its interactions with the soil, it also has a separate regeneration 'strategy' compared to its broadleaf neighbours. This relationship is very similar to the podocarp-broadleaf forests further south. Kauri demand much more light and require larger gaps to regenerate than such broadleaf trees as pūriri and kohekohe, which show far more shade tolerance. Unlike kauri, these broadleaf species can regenerate in areas where lower levels of light reach ground level, for example from a single branch falling off. Kauri trees must therefore remain alive long enough for a large disturbance to occur, allowing them sufficient light to regenerate. In areas where large amounts of forest are destroyed, such as by logging, kauri seedlings are able to regenerate much more easily due not only to increased sunlight, but their relatively strong resistance to wind and frosts. Kauri occupy the emergent layer of the forest, where they are exposed to the effects of the weather; however, the smaller trees that dominate the main canopy are sheltered both by the emergent trees above and by each other. Left in open areas without protection, these smaller trees are far less capable of regenerating.

When there is a disturbance severe enough to favour their regeneration, kauri trees regenerate en masse, producing a generation of trees of similar age after each disturbance. The distribution of kauri allows researchers to deduce when and where disturbances have occurred, and how large they may have been; the presence of abundant kauri may indicate that an area is prone to disturbance. Kauri seedlings can still occur in areas with low light but mortality rates increase for such seedlings, and those that survive self-thinning and grow to sapling stage tend to be found in higher light environments.

During periods with less disturbance, kauri tends to lose ground to broadleaf competitors which can better tolerate shaded environments. In the complete absence of disturbance, kauri tends to become rare as it is excluded by its competitors. Kauri biomass tends to decrease during such times, as more biomass becomes concentrated in angiosperm species like tōwai. Kauri trees also tend to become more randomly distributed in age, with each tree dying at a different point in time, and regeneration gaps becoming rare and sporadic. Over thousands of years, these varying regeneration strategies produce a tug of war effect where kauri retreats uphill during periods of calm, then takes over lower areas briefly during mass disturbances. Although such trends cannot be observed in a human lifetime, research into current patterns of distribution, behaviour of species in experimental conditions, and study of pollen sediments (see palynology) have helped shed light on the life history of kauri.

Kauri seeds may generally be taken from mature cones in late March. Each scale on a cone contains a single winged seed approximately 5 by 8 millimetres (0.20 in × 0.31 in) and attached to a thin wing perhaps half as large again. The cone is fully open and dispersed within only two to three days of starting.

Studies show that kauri develop root grafts through which they share water and nutrients with neighbours of the same species.

== Ethnobotany ==
=== Deforestation ===
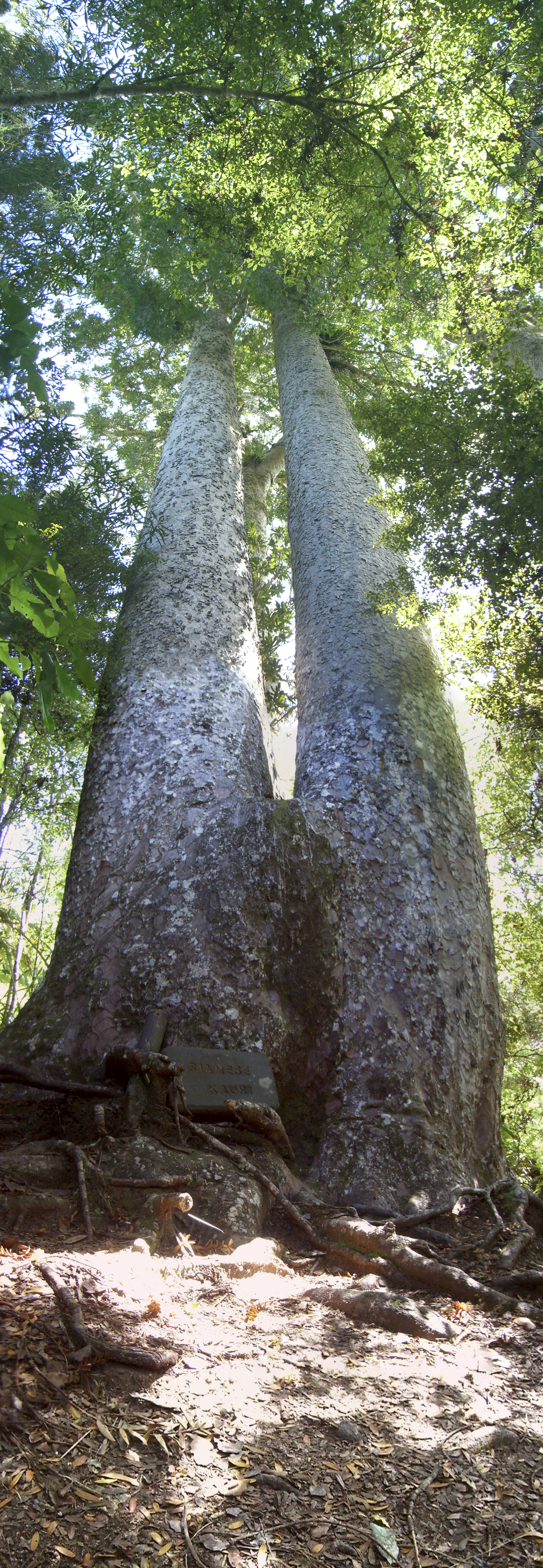
The Siamese Kauri grows on the Coromandel Peninsula.

Heavy logging, which began around 1820 and continued for a century, has considerably decreased the number of kauri trees. It has been estimated that before 1840, the kauri forests of northern New Zealand occupied at least 12,000 square kilometres (4,600 sq mi). The British Royal Navy sent four vessels, HMS Coromandel (1821), HMS Dromedary (1821), HMS Buffalo (1840), and HMS Tortoise (1841) to gather kauri-wood spars.

By 1900, less than 10 per cent of the original kauri survived. By the 1950s this area had decreased to about 1,400 square kilometres (540 sq mi) in 47 forests depleted of their best kauri. It is estimated that today, there is 4 per cent of uncut forest left in small pockets.

Estimates are that around half of the timber was accidentally or deliberately burnt. More than half of the remainder had been exported to Australia, Britain, and other countries, while the balance was used locally to build houses and ships. Much of the timber was sold for a return sufficient only to cover wages and expenses. From 1871 to 1895 the receipts indicate a rate of about 8 shillings (around NZ$20 in 2003) per 100 superficial feet (34 shillings/m^{3}).

The Government continued to sell large areas of kauri forests to sawmillers who, under no restrictions, took the most effective and economical steps to secure the timber, resulting in much waste and destruction. At a sale in 1908 more than 5,000 standing kauri trees, totalling about 20,000,000 superficial feet (47,000 m^{3}), were sold for less than £2 per tree (£2 in 1908 equates to around NZ$100 in 2003). It is said that in 1890 the royalty on standing timber fell in some cases to as low as twopence (NZ$0.45 in 2003) per 100 superficial feet (8 pence/m^{3}), though the expense of cutting and removing it to the mills was typically great due to the difficult terrain where they were located.

Probably the most controversial kauri logging decision in the last century was that of the National Government to initiate clear fell logging of the Warawara state forest (North of the Hokianga) in the late 1960s. This created a national outcry as this forest contains the second largest volume of kauri after the Waipoua forest and was until that time, essentially unlogged (Adams, 1980). The plan also involved considerable cost, requiring a long road to be driven up a steep high plateau into the heart of the protected area. Because the stands of kauri were dense, the ecological destruction in the affected plateau area (approximately a fifth of the forest by area, and a quarter by volume of timber) was essentially complete (as of the early 1990s most of the affected area contained a thick covering of native grasses with little or no kauri regeneration). Logging was stopped in fulfillment of an election pledge by the Labour Government of 1972. When the National Party was reelected in 1975, the ban on kauri logging in the Warawara remained in place, but was soon replaced by policies encouraging the logging of giant tōtara and other podocarps in the central North Island. The outcry over the Warawara was an important stepping stone towards the legal protection of the small percentage of remaining virgin kauri-podocarp forest in New Zealand's Government-owned forests.

== Māori traditions ==
Some Te Tai Tokerau Māori traditions see kauri trees as the legs of Tāne Mahuta, the god of the forest, holding apart the sky and the earth. Other traditional stories describe kauri and sperm whales as siblings, both children of Tāne Mahuta, one who decided to stay on land, and the other who decided to swim in the oceans.

== Uses ==
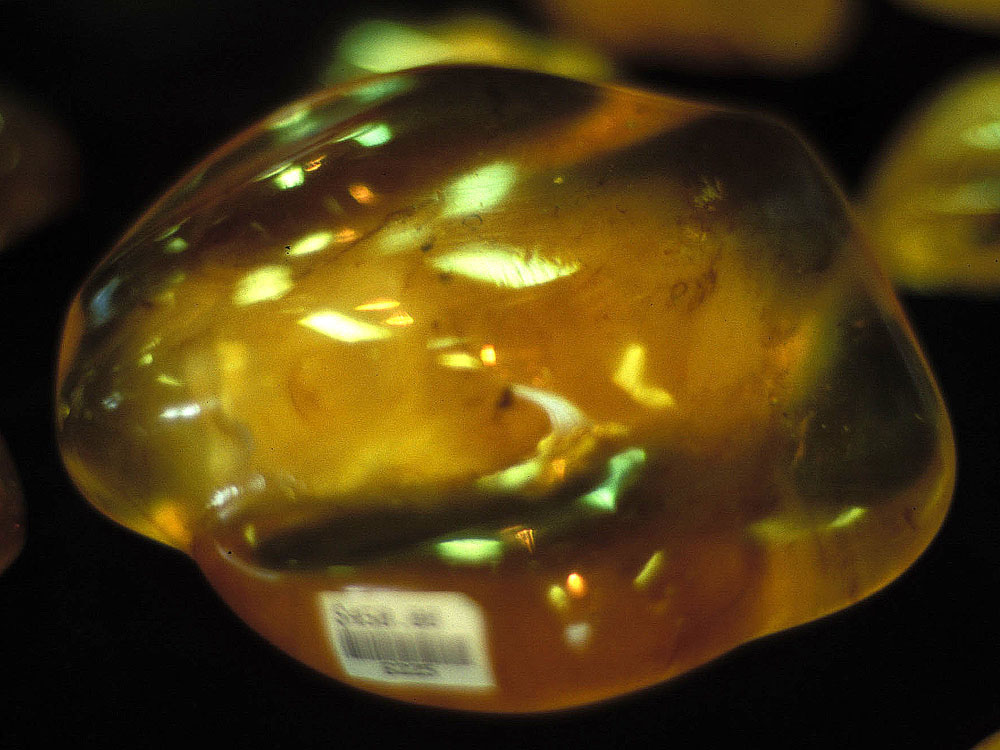
Kauri gum at the Kauri Museum, Northland, New Zealand

Kauri wood was traditionally used to create large-scale waka by Māori, which could seat hundreds of people due to the size of the logs.

Although today its use is far more restricted, in the past the size and strength of kauri timber made it a popular wood for construction and ship building, particularly for masts of sailing ships because of its parallel grain and the absence of branches for much of its height. Kauri crown and stump wood was much appreciated for its beauty, and was sought after for ornamental wood panelling as well as high-end furniture. Although not as highly prized, the light colour of kauri trunk wood made it also well-suited for more utilitarian furniture construction, as well as for use in the fabrication of cisterns, barrels, bridge construction material, fences, moulds for metal forges, large rollers for the textile industry, railway sleepers and cross bracing for mines and tunnels. Kauri timber was so prevalent in early European settlements that Ferdinand von Hochstetter, when visiting Auckland in 1859, estimated that nearly every building, except those made of stone, had been constructed using kauri timber.

In the late 19th and early 20th centuries Kauri gum (semi-fossilised kauri resin) was a valuable commodity, particularly for varnish, spurring the development of a gum-digger industry.

Today, the kauri is being considered as a long-term carbon sink. This is because estimates of the total carbon content in living above ground biomass and dead biomass of mature kauri forest are the second highest of any forest type recorded anywhere in the world. The estimated total carbon capture is up to nearly 1000 tonnes per hectare. In this capacity, kauri are bettered only by mature Eucalyptus regnans forest, and are far higher than any tropical or boreal forest type yet recorded. It is also conjectured that the process of carbon capture does not reach equilibrium, which along with no need of direct maintenance, makes kauri forests a potentially attractive alternative to short rotation forestry options such as Pinus radiata.

=== Timber ===
Technical specifications

- Moisture content of dried wood: 12 per cent
- Density of wood: 560 kg/m^{3} (35 lb/cu ft)
- Tensile strength: 88 MPa
- Modulus of elasticity: 9.1 GPa
- After felled kauri wood dries to a 12 per cent moisture content, the tangential contraction is 4.1 per cent and the radial contraction is 2.3 per cent.

Kauri is considered a first rate timber. The whiter sapwood is generally slightly lighter in weight. Kauri is not highly resistant to rot and when used in boatbuilding must be protected from the elements with paint, varnish or epoxy to avoid rot. Its popularity with boatbuilders is due to its very long, clear lengths, its relatively light weight and its beautiful sheen when oiled or varnished. Kauri wood planes and saws easily. Its wood holds screws and nails very well and does not readily split, crack, or warp. Kauri wood darkens with age to a richer golden brown colour. Very little New Zealand kauri is now sold, and the most commonly available kauri in New Zealand is Fiji kauri, which is very similar in appearance but lighter in weight.

=== Swamp kauri ===
Prehistoric kauri forests have been preserved in waterlogged soils as swamp kauri. A considerable number of kauri have been found buried in salt marshes, resulting from ancient natural changes such as volcanic eruptions, sea-level changes and floods. Such trees have been radiocarbon dated to 50,000 years ago or older. The bark and the seed cones of the trees often survive together with the trunk, although when excavated and exposed to the air, these parts undergo rapid deterioration. The quality of the disinterred wood varies. Some is in good shape, comparable to that of newly felled kauri, although often lighter in colour. The colour can be improved by the use of natural wood stains to heighten the details of the grain. After a drying process, such ancient kauri can be used for furniture, but not for construction.

=== Conservation ===
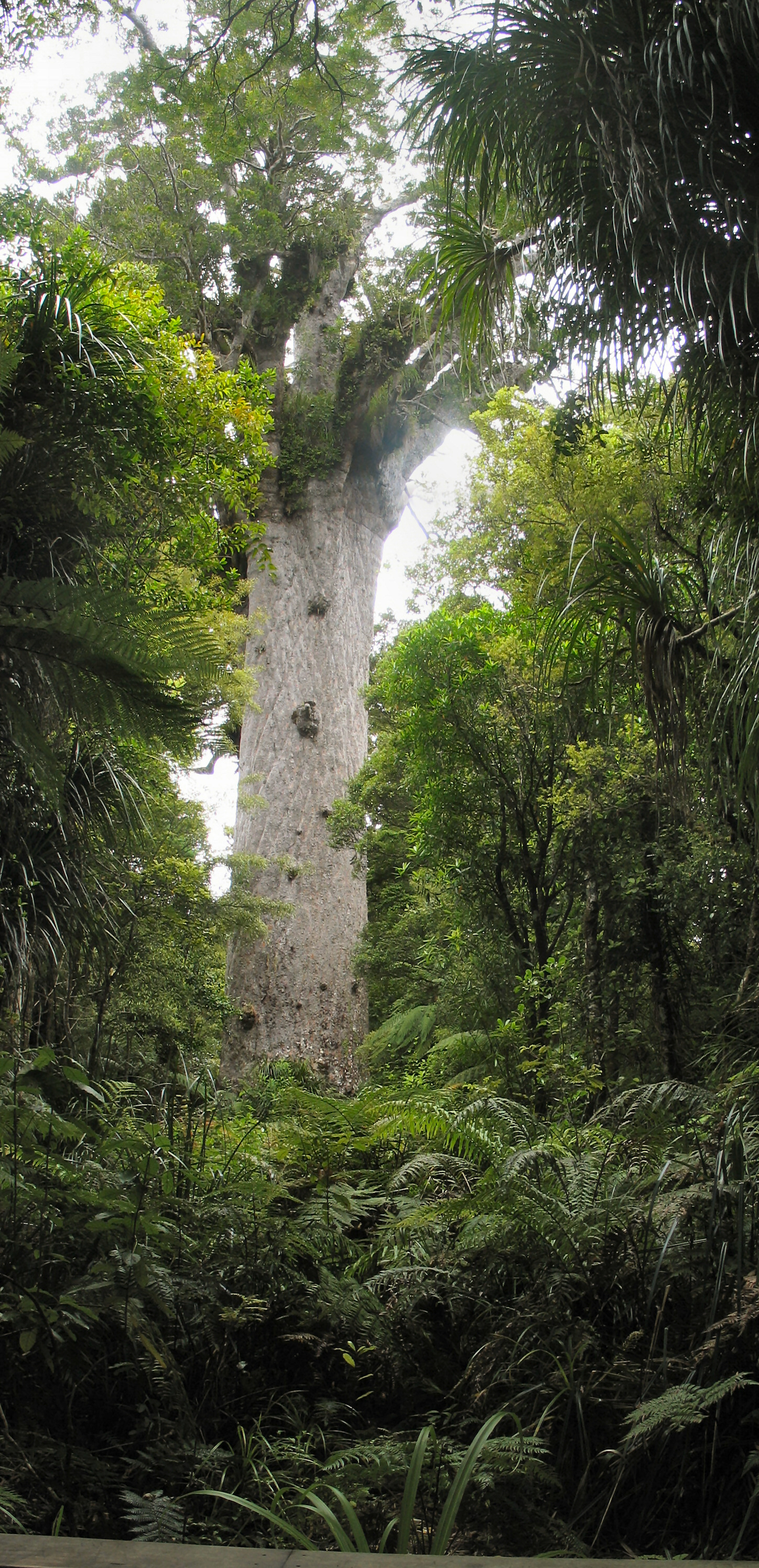
Tāne Mahuta ('Lord of the Forest')

The small remaining pockets of kauri forest in New Zealand have survived in areas that were not subjected to burning by Māori and were too inaccessible for European loggers. The largest area of mature kauri forest is Waipoua Forest in Northland. Mature and regenerating kauri can also be found in other national and regional parks such as Puketi and Omahuta Forests in Northland, the Waitākere Ranges near Auckland, and Coromandel Forest Park on the Coromandel Peninsula.

The importance of Waipoua Forest was that it is the only kauri forest retaining its former virgin condition, and that it was extensive enough to give reasonable promise of permanent survival. On 2 July 1952 an area of over 80 square kilometres (31 sq mi) of Waipoua was proclaimed a forest sanctuary after a petition to the Government. The zoologist William Roy McGregor was one of the driving forces in this movement, writing an 80-page illustrated pamphlet on the subject, which proved an effective manifesto for conservation. Waipoua Forest, together with the Warawara to the north, contains three quarters of New Zealand's remaining kauri. Kauri Grove on the Coromandel Peninsula is another area with a remaining cluster of kauri, and includes the Siamese Kauri, two trees with a conjoined lower trunk.

In 1921 philanthropic Cornishman James Trounson sold to the Government for £40,000 a large area adjacent to a few acres of Crown land and said to contain at least 4,000 kauri trees. From time to time Trounson gifted additional land, until what is known as Trounson Park comprised a total of 4 square kilometres (1.5 sq mi).

The most famous specimens are Tāne Mahuta and Te Matua Ngahere in Waipoua Forest. These two trees have become tourist attractions because of their size and accessibility. Tane Mahuta, named after the Māori forest god, is the biggest existing kauri with a girth of 13.77 metres (45.2 feet), a trunk height of 17.68 metres (58.0 feet), a total height of 51.2 metres (168 feet) and a total volume including the crown of 516.7 cubic metres (18,250 cubic feet). Te Matua Ngahere, which means 'Father of the Forest', is smaller but stouter than Tane Mahuta, with a girth (circumference) of 16.41 m (53.8 ft). Important note: all the measurements above were taken in 1971.

Kauri is common as a specimen tree in parks and gardens throughout New Zealand, prized for the distinctive look of young trees, its low maintenance once established (although seedlings are frost tender).

== Kauri dieback ==
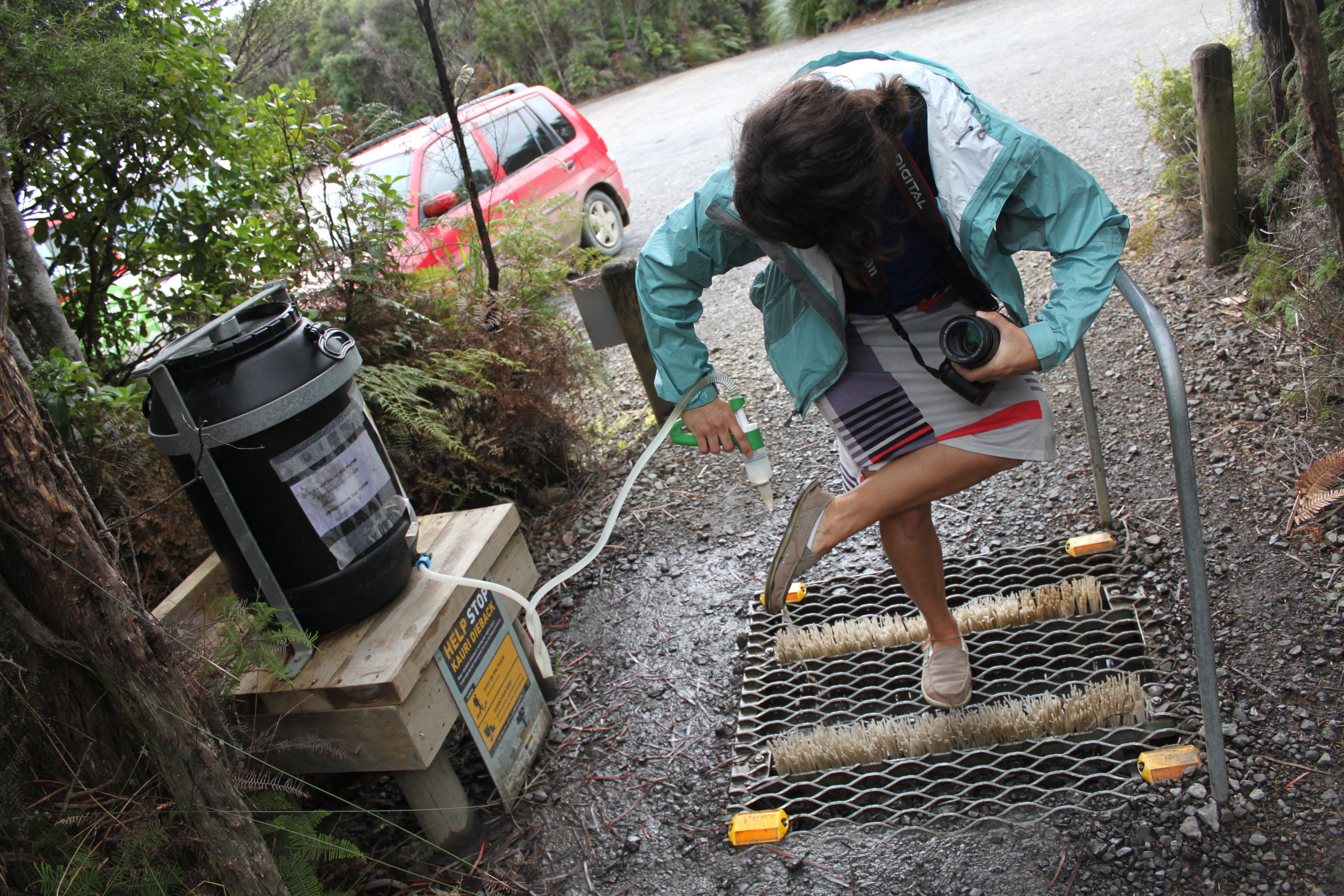
A woman washes her shoes to reduce the spread of kauri dieback disease in Waipoua Forest.

Kauri dieback was observed in the Waitākere Ranges caused by Phytophthora cinnamomi in the 1950s, again on Great Barrier Island in 1972 linked to a different pathogen, Phytophthora agathidicida and subsequently spread to kauri forest on the mainland. The disease, known as kauri dieback or kauri collar rot, is believed to be over 300 years old and causes yellowing leaves, thinning canopy, dead branches, lesions that bleed resin, and tree death.

Phytophthora agathidicida was identified as a new species in April 2008. Its closest known relative is Phytophthora katsurae. The pathogen is believed to be spread on people's shoes or by mammals, particularly feral pigs. A collaborative response team has been formed to work on the disease. The team includes MAF Biosecurity, the Conservation Department, Auckland and Northland regional councils, Waikato Regional Council, and Bay of Plenty Regional Council. The team is charged with assessing the risk, determining methods and their feasibility to limit the spread, collecting more information (e.g. how widespread), and ensuring a coordinated response. The Department of Conservation has issued guidelines to prevent the spread of the disease, including keeping to defined tracks, cleaning footwear before and after entering kauri forest areas, and staying away from kauri roots.

== See also ==
- Kauri Gum
- Forestry in New Zealand
- Gum-digger
- Kauri Museum
- List of kauri parks in New Zealand
- List of superlative trees
- Northland temperate kauri forest

== Bibliography ==
- King, Michael (2003). The Penguin History of New Zealand. Penguin Books. ISBN 978-0-14-301867-4.
- Reed, Alfred (1972) [1953]. The Story of the Kauri. A.H. and A.W. Reed. ISBN 978-0-589-00732-4.
- Adams, J.G. (1980). Kauri: A King Among Kings. Wilson & Horton Group Publication. ISBN 978-0-86864-080-8.
