= Waipoua Forest =

Forest on New Zealand's North Island

Coordinates: 35°39′S 173°33′E

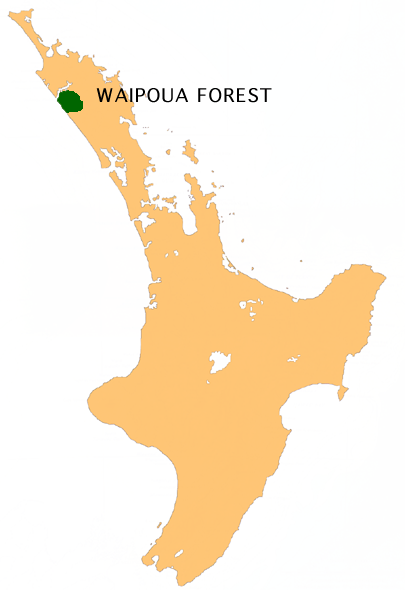
Location of Waipoua Forest

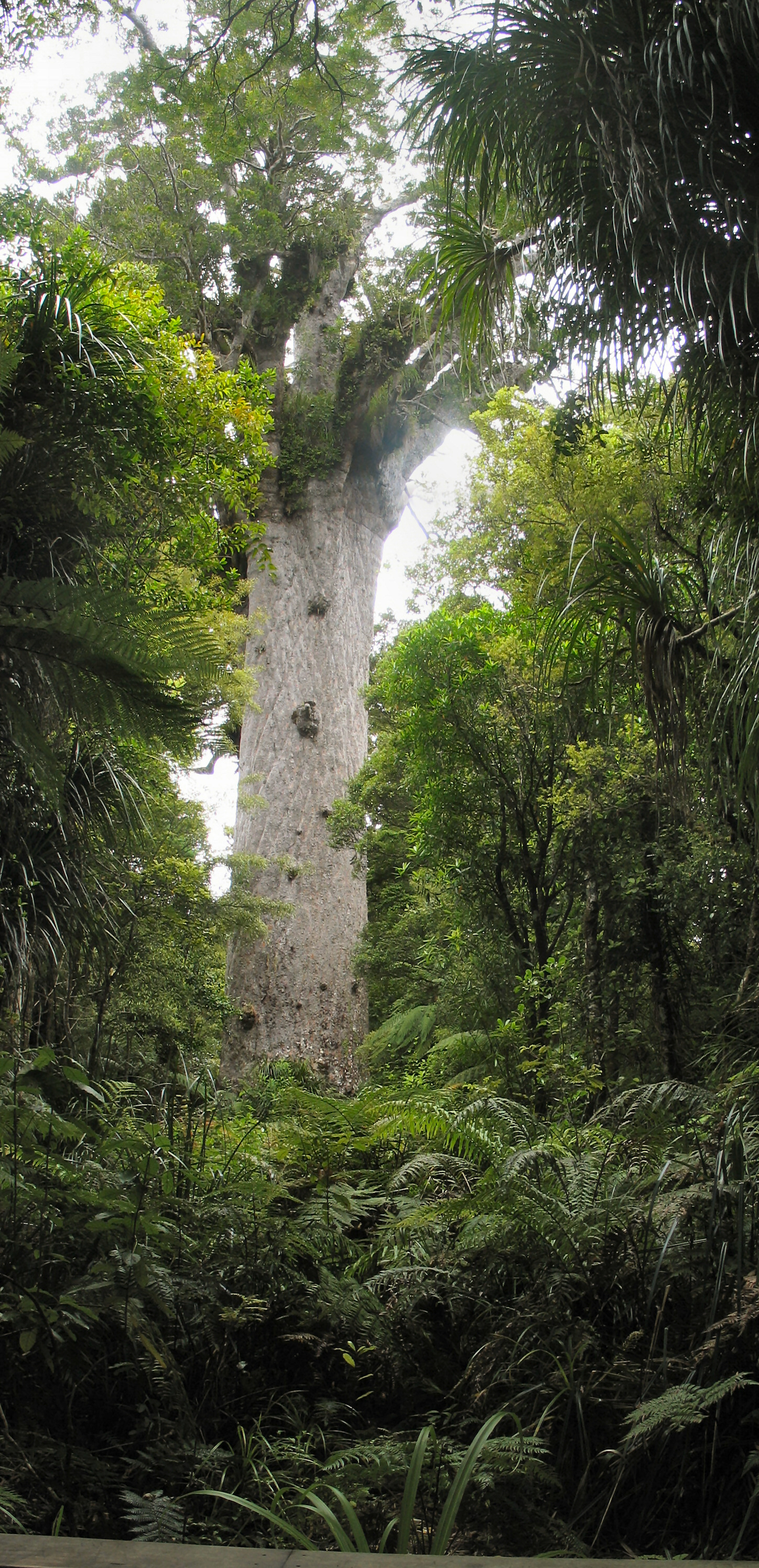
Tāne Mahuta, Lord of the Forest, is the largest living kauri tree in New Zealand.

The Waipoua Forest is a forest on the west coast of New Zealand's North Island. It preserves some of the best examples of kauri forest remaining in New Zealand of which it is notable for having two of the largest living kauri trees, Tāne Mahuta and Te Matua Ngahere.

A community-based volunteer organisation, the Waipoua Forest Trust, helps maintain the forest. The sanctuary is bordered to the south by the 350 hectares (860 acres) Professor W.R McGregor Reserve, named after W. R. McGregor (1894–1977). In the 1940s, McGregor, and others, successfully campaigned to end logging of the forest and to have it declared a sanctuary, a status it achieved in 1952.

Approximately 200,000 people visit Tāne Mahuta every year. This has led to concerns about the health of the forest and the spread of kauri dieback disease.

== Ecology ==
The Waipoua, Warawara and Puketi forests together contain about three quarters of New Zealand's remaining mature kauri trees. The Waipoua forest holds the largest remaining stand of these trees.

It contains Te Matua Ngahere, a notable kauri tree that is the largest in New Zealand by girth and the second largest by volume, and is estimated to be from 2,000 to 3,000 years old. The trees are threatened by the fungus Phytophthora taxon Agathis. The Waipoua Forest Trust has called for urgent action by the government to find a cure for the problem. The forest has the largest population of North Island brown kiwi in Northland. Populations of the endangered North Island kōkako can be found in the high plateau country.

== History ==
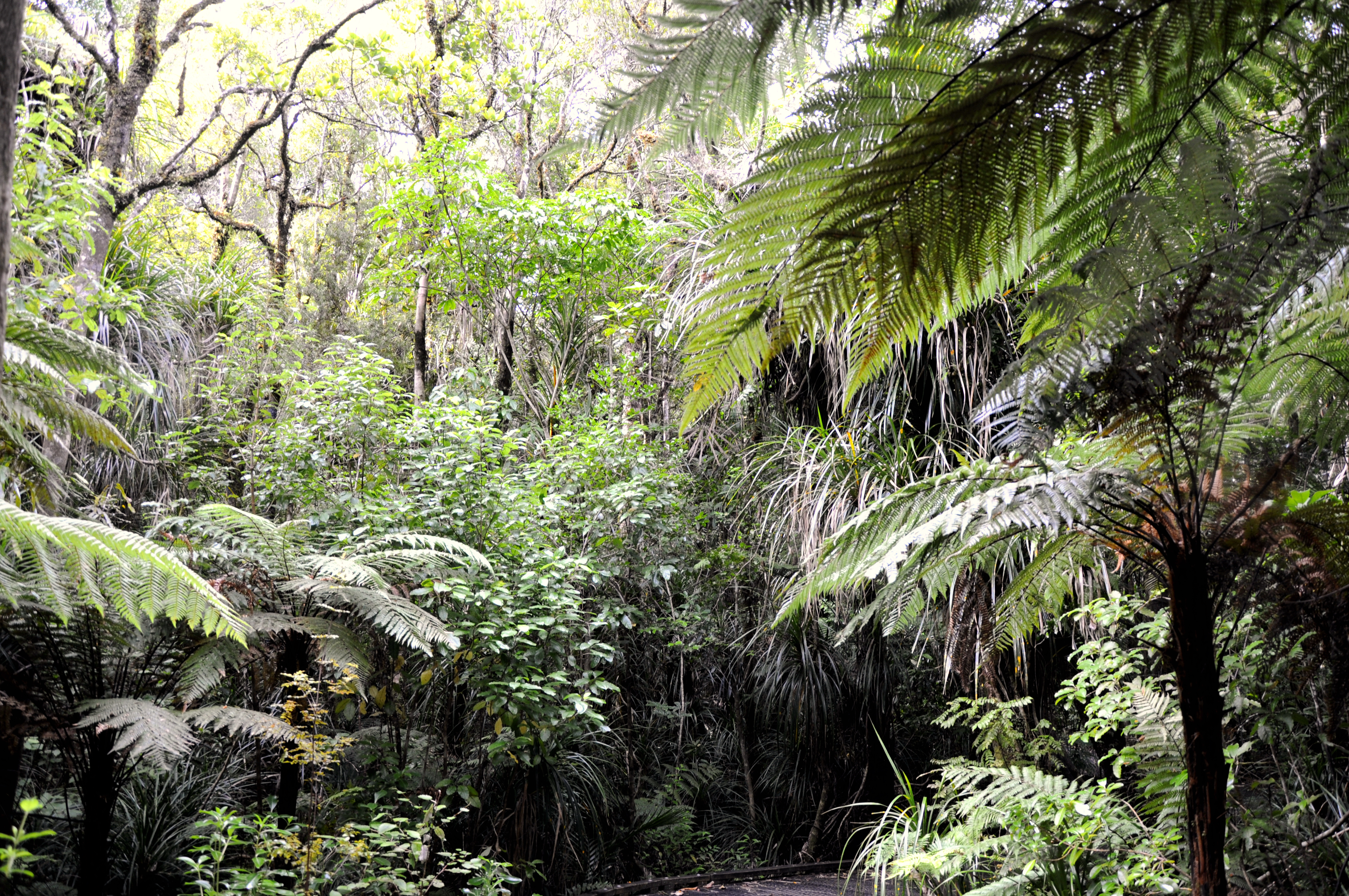
The jungle inside Waipoua Forest.

The Waipoua Forest was bought from Māori namely Tiopira Kinaka (Te Roroa) and Parore Te Awha (Te Kuihi) as part of the Waipoua Block No.1 in 1876 for a little over £2,000. At the time it covered about 80 square kilometres (31 sq mi).

In 1885 the Waipoua Forest came under the provision of the State Forests Act, and an area of 90 km² was constituted a State Forest Reserve. One of the reasons for its escape from destruction in earlier days was its remoteness combined with the difficulty of extracting its timber. Another was, that like the Warawara to the North, rainfall was more consistent and abundant so that Māori and European fires had not engulfed it (as happened to the Kaihu, Puhipuhi and large parts of the Coromandel forest in the 1870s and 1880s).

In 1907 the Waipoua Forest, the Warawara forest and one or two other smaller reserves were the only virgin kauri forests left belonging to the state. In 1913 a Royal Commission on Forestry recommended that a specially selected area of 0.8 square kilometres (0.31 sq mi) of the Waipoua Forest, and the whole of the Warawara Forest of 50 square kilometres (19 sq mi), be established as national kauri forests for the people of New Zealand. In July 1926, the government announced a road was put through Waipoua Forest to provide access to the lands of neighbouring settlers, and work began the same month beginning with 15 men. The Waipoua road was opened on 13 January 1928 by then-prime minister Joseph Gordon Coates, more than 100 vehicles were reported to have left Dargaville at the time to attend the opening ceremony.

In the 1940s it became known that the State Forest Service was cutting kauri at Waipoua. In 1947 the Whangarei Progressive Society, in association with the Royal Forest and Bird Protection Society, the Waipoua Preservation Society, and other organisations secured more than 43,000 signatures on a petition asking for the 'declaration of the Waipoua State Forest as a national park under a board of trust, and that all milling and other state forest activities should cease'. The petition consisted of thirteen volumes of signatures, which was presented by the MP for Marsden, AJ Murdoch in a wheelbarrow to parliament on 25 September 1947. Its hope was that 160 square kilometres (62 sq mi) at Waipoua should be set aside for all time, inviolate from interference by man. Other petitions followed, and on 2 July 1952 an area of over 80 square kilometres (31 sq mi) was proclaimed a forest sanctuary. The zoologist William Roy McGregor was one of the driving forces in this movement, writing an 80-page illustrated pamphlet on the subject, which proved an effective manifesto for conservation.

In the late 1960s, in violation of the 1913 recommendations, adopted de facto, the National Government initiated clear felling in the Warawara forest. This was not stopped until 1972 following a large public outcry and fulfilment of an election promise of the incoming Labor Government. In this short period, approximately 1/5 of the forest was felled (about 1/4 by timber volume).

A forest fire threatened Waipoua Forest when it broke out on 1 February 2007 after someone had been cooking mussels on an open fire at a nearby beach. The fire burnt pine plantation adjoining the native forest, but destroyed ecologically significant wetland vegetation, and came within 3 kilometres (1.9 mi) of the iconic Tāne Mahuta. The blaze was fought by local fire fighters and conservation volunteers, who managed to stop its spread using helicopters and fire breaks. Millions of dollars of pine, and many endangered birds, were lost, including an estimated 20 North Island brown kiwi. In all the fire claimed over 2 square kilometres (0.77 sq mi) of vegetation.

== Climate ==
Climate data for Waipoua Visitor Centre (1961–1990 normals, extremes 1928–1992)
Month	Jan	Feb	Mar	Apr	May	Jun	Jul	Aug	Sep	Oct	Nov	Dec	Year
Record high °C (°F)	35.0 (95.0)	30.2 (86.4)	30.2 (86.4)	28.6 (83.5)	25.0 (77.0)	24.3 (75.7)	20.8 (69.4)	22.5 (72.5)	26.1 (79.0)	26.0 (78.8)	26.1 (79.0)	29.9 (85.8)	35.0 (95.0)
Mean maximum °C (°F)	27.3 (81.1)	27.3 (81.1)	26.6 (79.9)	24.1 (75.4)	21.9 (71.4)	19.7 (67.5)	18.8 (65.8)	19.0 (66.2)	20.5 (68.9)	22.2 (72.0)	23.9 (75.0)	25.8 (78.4)	28.3 (82.9)
Mean daily maximum °C (°F)	23.2 (73.8)	23.6 (74.5)	22.7 (72.9)	20.3 (68.5)	17.8 (64.0)	15.8 (60.4)	15.0 (59.0)	15.4 (59.7)	16.5 (61.7)	17.9 (64.2)	19.7 (67.5)	21.6 (70.9)	19.1 (66.4)
Daily mean °C (°F)	18.2 (64.8)	18.6 (65.5)	17.8 (64.0)	15.5 (59.9)	13.2 (55.8)	11.4 (52.5)	10.5 (50.9)	11.0 (51.8)	12.1 (53.8)	13.5 (56.3)	15.0 (59.0)	16.7 (62.1)	14.5 (58.0)
Mean daily minimum °C (°F)	13.1 (55.6)	13.5 (56.3)	12.8 (55.0)	10.6 (51.1)	8.5 (47.3)	7.0 (44.6)	6.0 (42.8)	6.6 (43.9)	7.7 (45.9)	9.0 (48.2)	10.3 (50.5)	11.7 (53.1)	9.7 (49.5)
Mean minimum °C (°F)	7.8 (46.0)	8.2 (46.8)	7.1 (44.8)	4.9 (40.8)	2.4 (36.3)	0.8 (33.4)	0.4 (32.7)	0.7 (33.3)	2.3 (36.1)	3.3 (37.9)	4.7 (40.5)	6.5 (43.7)	−0.8 (30.6)
Record low °C (°F)	0.6 (33.1)	0.6 (33.1)	1.7 (35.1)	0.0 (32.0)	−0.8 (30.6)	−1.8 (28.8)	−2.3 (27.9)	−3.3 (26.1)	−1.5 (29.3)	−1.4 (29.5)	0.8 (33.4)	2.1 (35.8)	−3.3 (26.1)
Average rainfall mm (inches)	109.8 (4.32)	87.5 (3.44)	87.9 (3.46)	90.4 (3.56)	139.8 (5.50)	188.8 (7.43)	157.2 (6.19)	148.9 (5.86)	134.4 (5.29)	114.3 (4.50)	82.4 (3.24)	89.4 (3.52)	1,430.8 (56.31)
Source: Earth Sciences NZ (rainfall 1991–2020)

== Waipoua Forest Trust ==
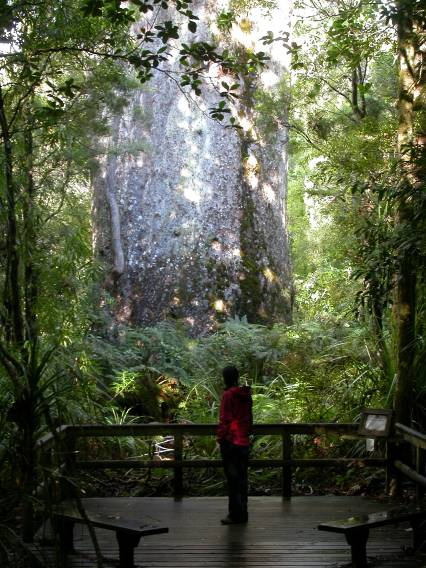
Girth of Te Matua Ngahere compared with a person for scale

Waipoua Forest Trust is a community-based environmental organisation that was set up in 1999 to protect the kauri forests in the Waipoua area. The Trust is a joint partnership between the Native Forests Restoration Trust and Te Roroa, the Māori guardians of Waipoua. The two organisations help guide the Department of Conservation in its management role.

=== Property ===
In March 2000 the New Zealand Minister of Internal Affairs, Mark Burton, launched the Millennium Kauri Forest to the south of the Waipoua Forest, giving a $1.4 million lottery grant and a gift of land title to the Waipoua Forest Trust. Most of the money went towards further purchases of land to protect the southern boundaries of the forest. The Trust co-operates with the Native Forests Restoration Trust, which operates the Professor McGregor Reserve. It has bought farmland to the north of the McGregor Reserve, helping preserve the southern boundary of the Waipoua catchment. Through a Queen Elizabeth II National Trust covenant, the trust administers about 16 ha of the Marlborough Road forest to the south of the Waipoua reserve.

=== Activities ===
The trust is attempting to save the last of the ancient kauri trees, and to assist the wildlife in the park to recover. The trust is actively engaged in reseeding and converting previously logged land to its original forested state and is also working on establishing a kiwi hatchery. Awareness has been made through a photographic display at the Kauri Museum at Matakohe. The ASB Community Trust granted the Waipoua Forest Trust $810,000 in 2007.

Volunteers engage in weeding previously planted areas, maintaining the ground, collecting flax seed, and monitoring and eradicating pests such as rats and possums. As of June 2007 the trust had invested more than NZ $4 million in land protection and restoration. The trust has been supported by Kaipara District council in its application to the Ministry for the Environment for funding to replant areas within the Domain with indigenous vegetation. In November 2007 the trust raised an outcry over a decision by the Department of Conservation to cut down a 600-year-old kauri tree as part of a road widening project.

In April 2009, Alex Nathan, who is chairman of both Te Roroa Whatu Ora and Waipoua Forest trust, met with his counterpart from the Yakushima community in Japan, which has similar concerns about preserving ancient giant trees. The two leaders launched the "Family of Ancient Trees" project to raise mutual awareness and encourage eco-tourism. The agreement followed a series of visits and talks between members of the trust and other concerned New Zealand groups and their opposite numbers in Japan. In May 2009 the trust was one of the sponsors of the Waipoua Forest run, in which many Japanese visitors participated.

== See also ==
- List of Kauri Parks in New Zealand
- Kauri Gum
