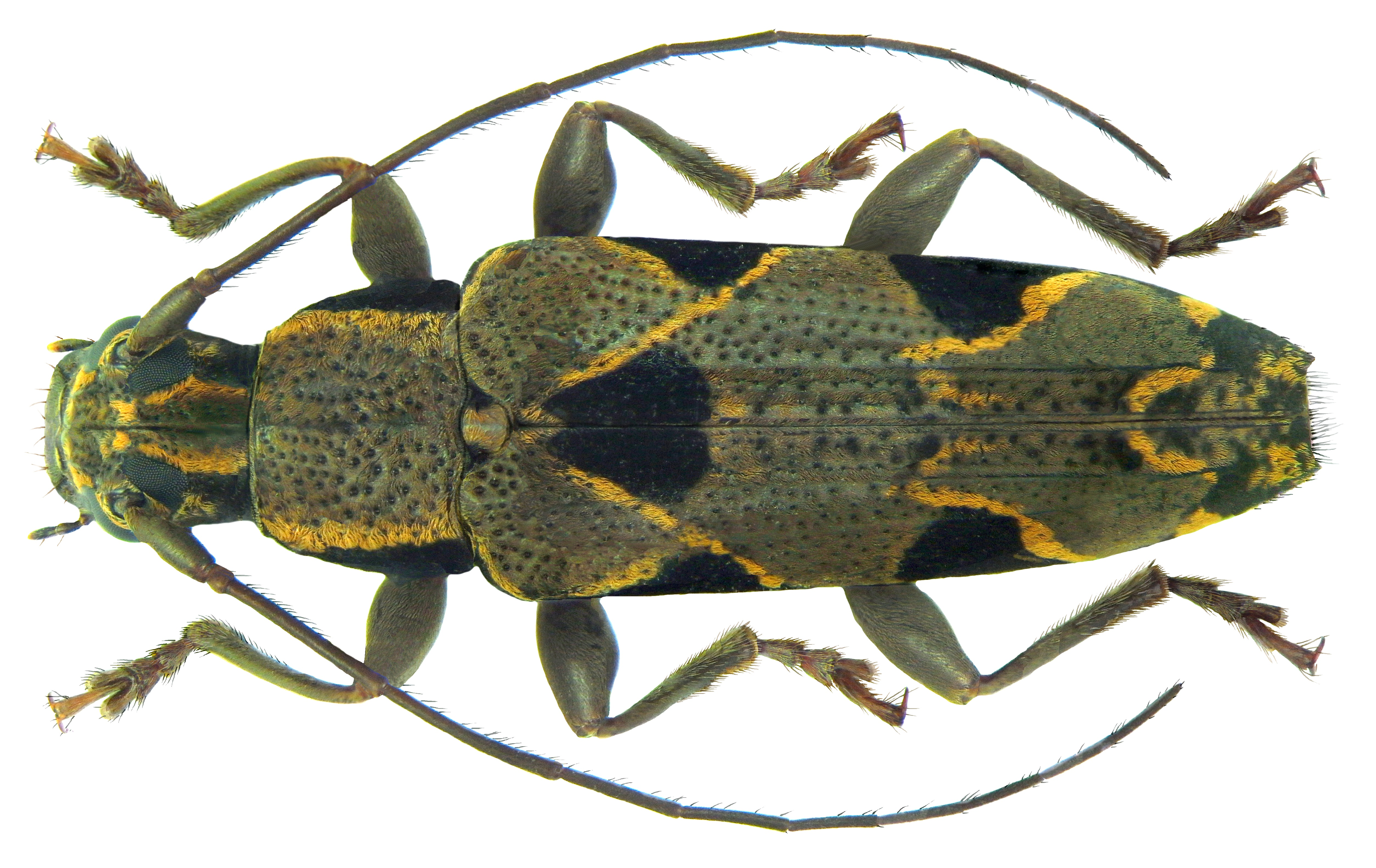
- Tmesisternus distinctus

Scientific classification
- Kingdom: Animalia
- Phylum: Arthropoda
- Class: Insecta
- Order: Coleoptera
- Suborder: Polyphaga
- Infraorder: Cucujiformia
- Family: Cerambycidae
- Subfamily: Lamiinae
- Tribe: Tmesisternini; Blanchard, 1853

= Tmesisternini =

Tribe of beetles

Tmesisternini is a tribe of beetles in the subfamily Lamiinae containing the following genera:

- Arrhenotoides Breuning, 1945
- Blapsilon Pascoe, 1860
- Buprestomorpha Thomson, 1860
- Epiblapsilon Gressitt, 1984
- Falsapolia Breuning, 1945
- Pascoea White, 1855
- Sepicana Kriesche, 1923
- Sphingnotus Perroud, 1855
- Sulawesiella Weigel & Withaar, 2006
- Temnosternopsis Breuning, 1939
- Temnosternus White, 1855
- Tmesisternopsis Breuning, 1945
- Tmesisternus Latreille, 1829
- Trigonoptera Perroud, 1855
