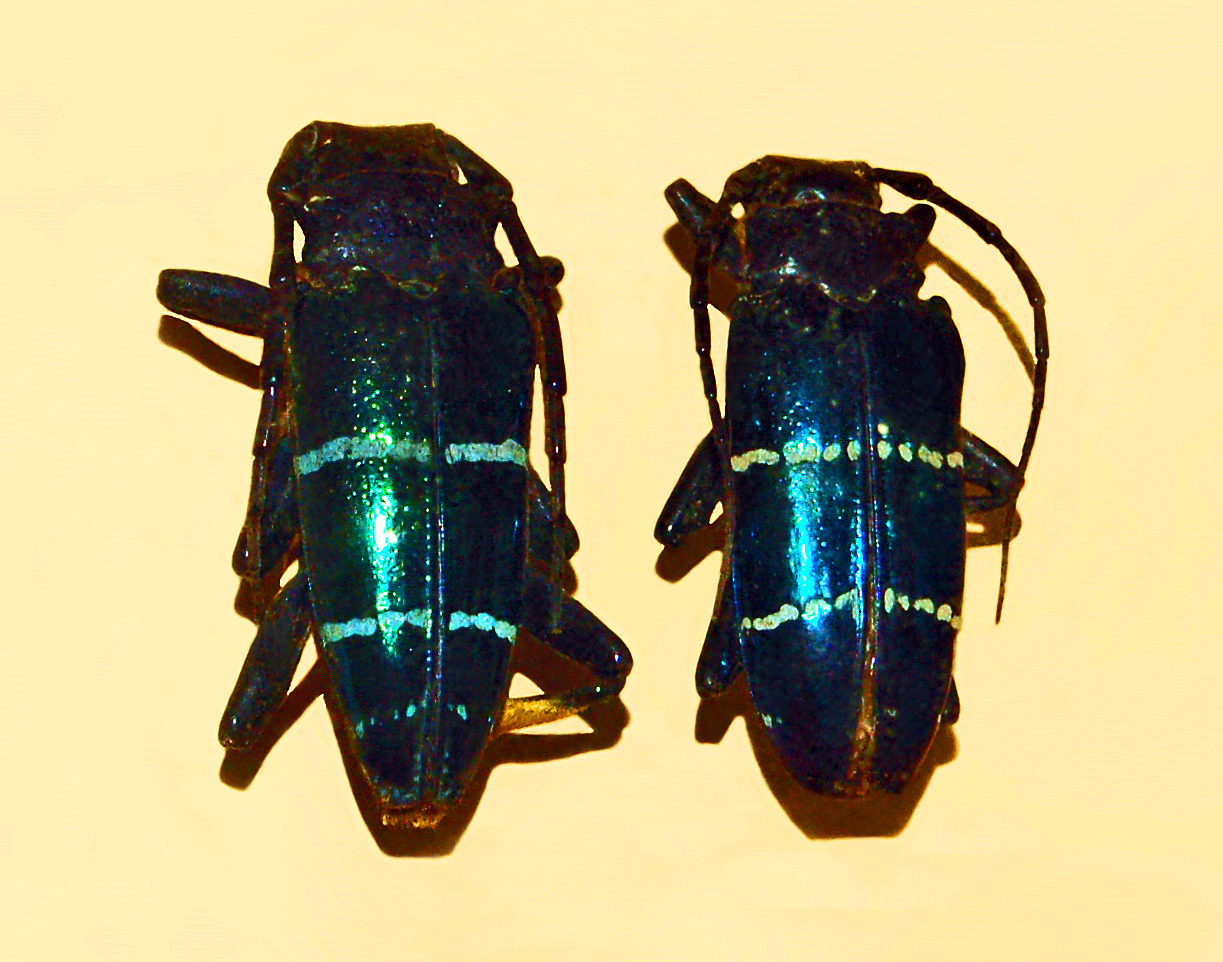
- Sphingnotus mirabilis from New Guinea

Scientific classification
- Kingdom: Animalia
- Phylum: Arthropoda
- Clade: Pancrustacea
- Class: Insecta
- Order: Coleoptera
- Suborder: Polyphaga
- Infraorder: Cucujiformia
- Family: Cerambycidae
- Subfamily: Lamiinae
- Tribe: Tmesisternini
- Genus: Sphingnotus
- Species: S. mirabilis

Binomial name
- Sphingnotus mirabilis (Boisduval, 1835)

Synonyms
- Icthyosoma mirabile Montrouzier, 1855; Sphingnotus mirabilis mirabilis Gressitt, 1984; Tmesisternus mirabilis Boisduval, 1835

= Sphingnotus mirabilis =

Species of beetle

Sphingnotus mirabilis is a species of beetle belonging to the family Cerambycidae.

== Description ==
Sphingnotus mirabilis can reach a length of 25–40 millimetres (0.98–1.57 in). Head, prothorax and elitra have a brilliant metallic blue colour. Elyra bears two trasversal whitish or azure bands.

== Distribution ==
This species can be found in New Guinea.

== List of subspecies ==
- Sphingnotus mirabilis admirabilis Kriesche, 1923
- Sphingnotus mirabilis keyensis Schwarzer, 1924
- Sphingnotus mirabilis mirabilis (Boisduval, 1835)
- Sphingnotus mirabilis mniszechi Perroud, 1855
- Sphingnotus mirabilis salomonum Breuning, 1945
- Sphingnotus mirabilis splendens Gressitt, 1984
