= Blapsilon austrocaledonicum =

Scientific classification
- Kingdom: Animalia
- Phylum: Arthropoda
- Class: Insecta
- Order: Coleoptera
- Suborder: Polyphaga
- Infraorder: Cucujiformia
- Family: Cerambycidae
- Genus: Blapsilon
- Species: B. austrocaledonicum

Binomial name
- Blapsilon austrocaledonicum (Montrouzier, 1861)

Synonyms
- Blapsilon baloghi Breuning, 1978; Blapsilon elongatum Fauvel, 1906; Lamia (Penthea?) austrocaledonica Montrouzier, 1861; Blapsilon austrocaledonica (Montrouzier) Hayashi, 1961 (misspelling)

Species of beetle

Blapsilon austrocaledonicum is a species of beetle in the family Cerambycidae. It was described by Xavier Montrouzier in 1861, originally under the genus Lamia. It is known from New Caledonia. It feeds on Araucaria laubenfelsii.
