= Pascoea spinicollis =

Scientific classification
- Domain: Eukaryota
- Kingdom: Animalia
- Phylum: Arthropoda
- Class: Insecta
- Order: Coleoptera
- Suborder: Polyphaga
- Infraorder: Cucujiformia
- Family: Cerambycidae
- Genus: Pascoea
- Species: P. spinicollis

Binomial name
- Pascoea spinicollis (Boisduval, 1835)

Species of beetle

Pascoea spinicollis is a species of beetle in the family Cerambycidae. It was described by Jean Baptiste Boisduval in 1835.
