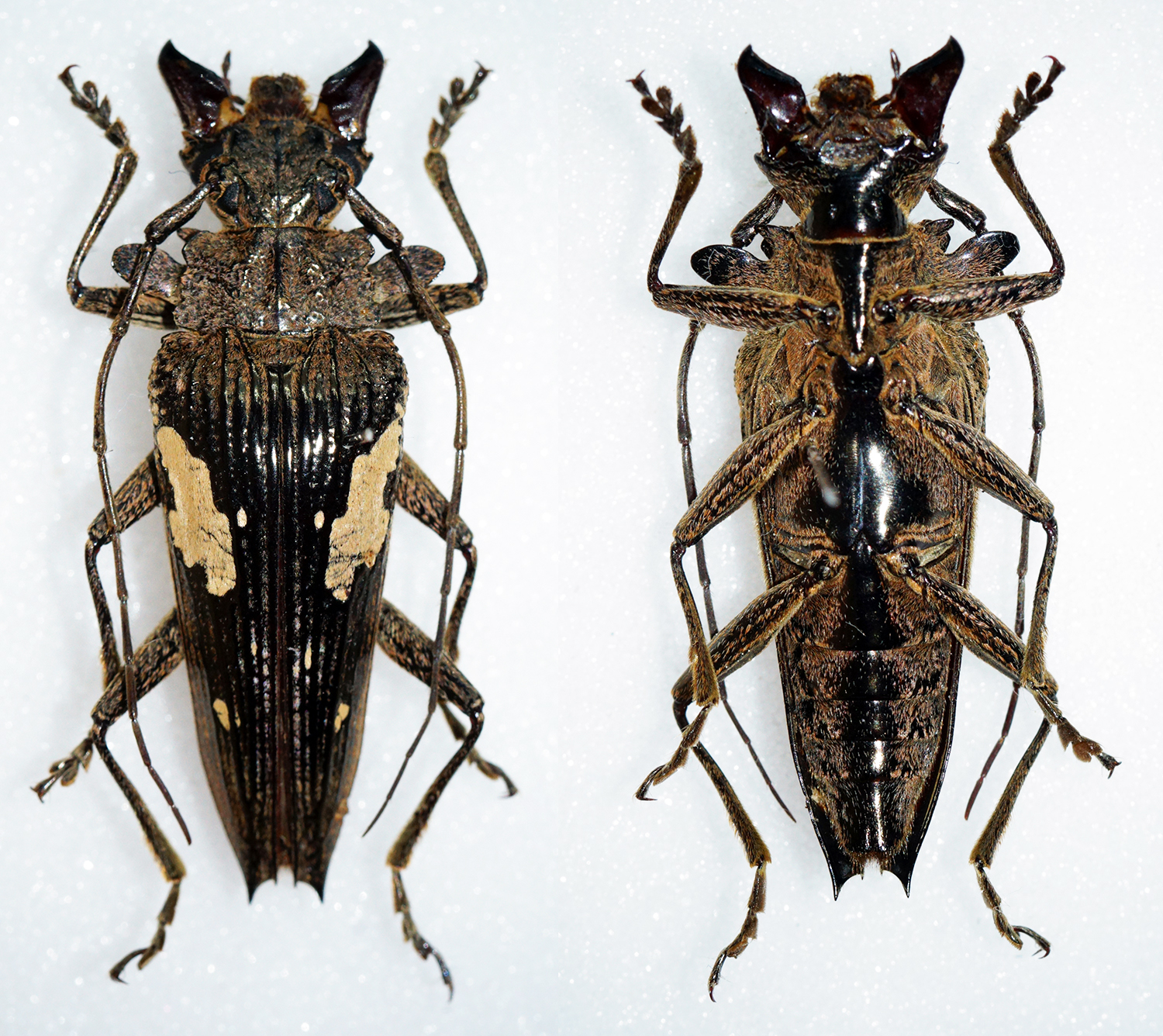
- Sepicana arfakensis male

Scientific classification
- Domain: Eukaryota
- Kingdom: Animalia
- Phylum: Arthropoda
- Class: Insecta
- Order: Coleoptera
- Suborder: Polyphaga
- Infraorder: Cucujiformia
- Family: Cerambycidae
- Tribe: Tmesisternini
- Genus: Sepicana

= Sepicana =

Genus of beetles

Sepicana is a genus of longhorn beetles of the subfamily Lamiinae, containing the following species:

- Sepicana albomaculata (Gahan, 1915)
- Sepicana arfakensis Breuning, 1950
- Sepicana armata (Montrouzier, 1855)
- Sepicana hauseri (Aurivillius, 1907)
- Sepicana migsominea Gilmour, 1949
- Sepicana shanahani Gressitt, 1984
