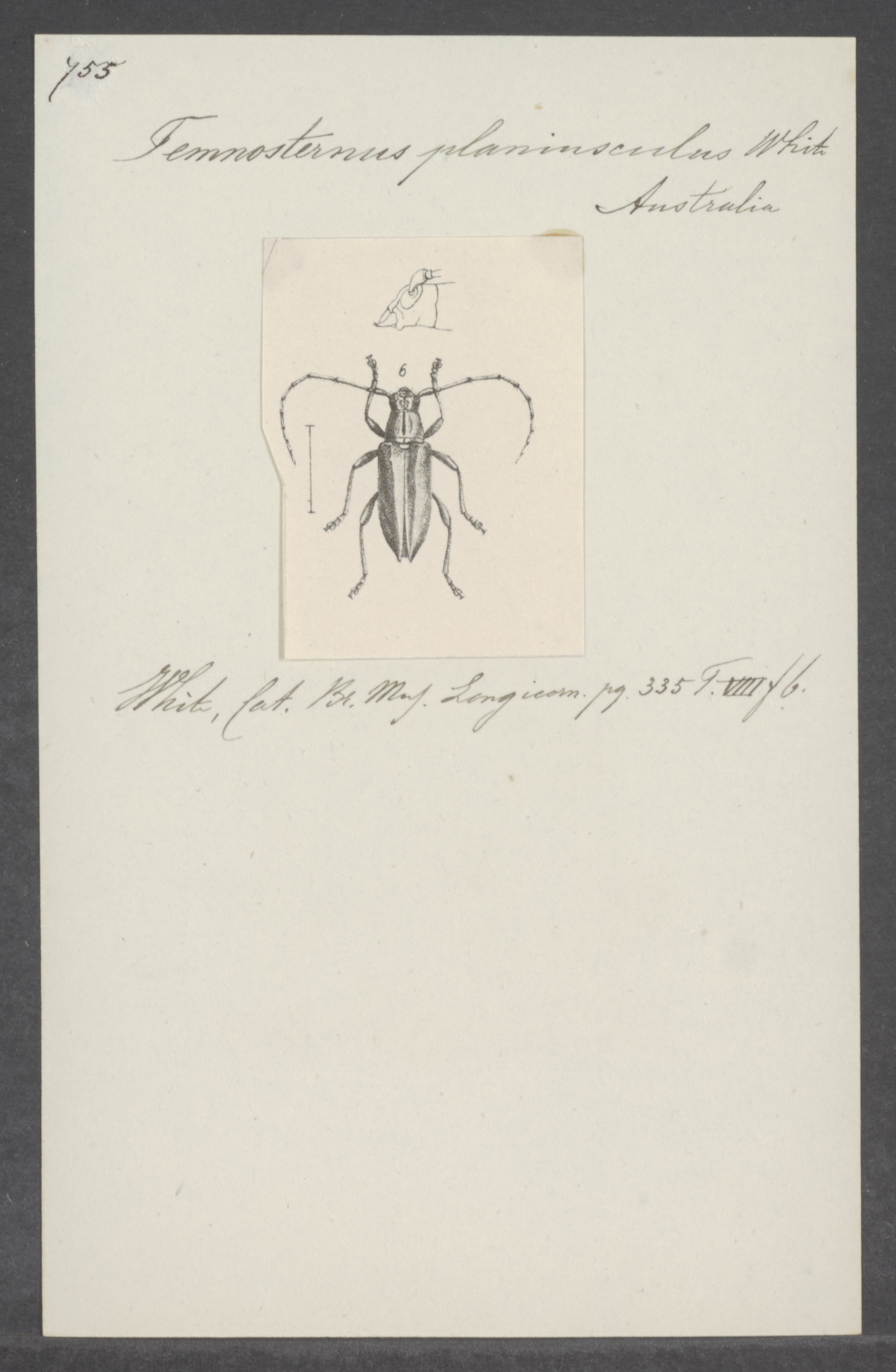
- Illustration of Temnosternus from the Special Collections of the University of Amsterdam

Scientific classification
- Domain: Eukaryota
- Kingdom: Animalia
- Phylum: Arthropoda
- Class: Insecta
- Order: Coleoptera
- Suborder: Polyphaga
- Infraorder: Cucujiformia
- Family: Cerambycidae
- Tribe: Tmesisternini
- Genus: Temnosternus; White, 1855

Synonyms
- Temnosternopsis Breuning, 1939; Falsapolia Breuning, 1945; Tuberothelais Breuning, 1963

= Temnosternus =

Genus of beetles

Temnosternus is a genus of longhorn beetles of the subfamily Lamiinae.

== Species ==
Temnosternus contains the following species:

- Temnosternus apicalis Pascoe, 1878
- Temnosternus catulus McKeown, 1942
- Temnosternus dissimilis Pascoe, 1859
- Temnosternus flavolineatus Breuning, 1939
- Temnosternus flavopunctulatus Breuning, 1966
- Temnosternus grossepunctatus Breuning, 1939
- Temnosternus mosaicus Slipinski & Escalona, 2013
- Temnosternus niveoscriptus McKeown, 1942
- Temnosternus ochreopictus (Breuning, 1961)
- Temnosternus pictus (Breuning, 1939)
- Temnosternus planiusculus White, 1855
- Temnosternus quadrituberculatus McKeown, 1942
- Temnosternus subtruncatus (Breuning, 1948)
- Temnosternus undulatus McKeown, 1942
- Temnosternus vitulus Pascoe, 1871
