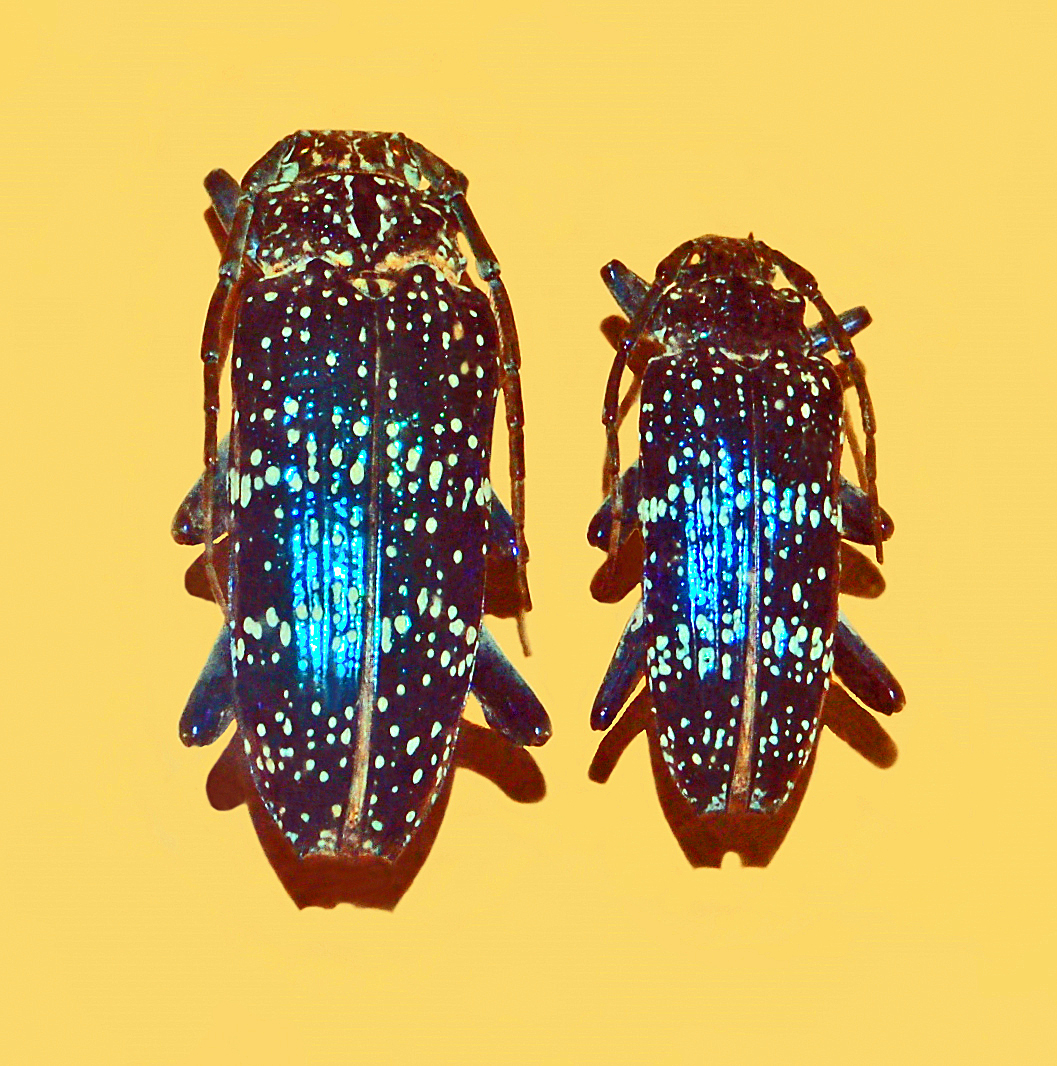
- Sphingnotus insignis albertisi from New Guinea

Scientific classification
- Domain: Eukaryota
- Kingdom: Animalia
- Phylum: Arthropoda
- Class: Insecta
- Order: Coleoptera
- Suborder: Polyphaga
- Infraorder: Cucujiformia
- Family: Cerambycidae
- Subfamily: Lamiinae
- Tribe: Tmesisternini
- Genus: Sphingnotus; Perroud, 1855

= Sphingnotus =

Genus of beetles

Sphingnotus is a genus of beetles belonging to the family Cerambycidae.

== List of species ==
- Sphingnotus dunningi Pascoe, 1867
- Sphingnotus insignis Perroud, 1855
- Sphingnotus mirabilis (Boisduval, 1835)
