= Blapsilon montrouzieri =

Scientific classification
- Kingdom: Animalia
- Phylum: Arthropoda
- Class: Insecta
- Order: Coleoptera
- Suborder: Polyphaga
- Infraorder: Cucujiformia
- Family: Cerambycidae
- Genus: Blapsilon
- Species: B. montrouzieri

Binomial name
- Blapsilon montrouzieri Thomson, 1865

Synonyms
- Blapsilon cyanipes Fauvel, 1906

Species of beetle

Blapsilon montrouzieri is a species of beetle in the family Cerambycidae. It was described by James Thomson in 1865. It is known from New Caledonia.
