= Temnosternus dissimilis =

Scientific classification
- Domain: Eukaryota
- Kingdom: Animalia
- Phylum: Arthropoda
- Class: Insecta
- Order: Coleoptera
- Suborder: Polyphaga
- Infraorder: Cucujiformia
- Family: Cerambycidae
- Genus: Temnosternus
- Species: T. dissimilis

Binomial name
- Temnosternus dissimilis Pascoe, 1859

Synonyms
- Temnosternus imbilensis McKeown, 1940

Species of beetle

Temnosternus dissimilis is a species of beetle in the family Cerambycidae. It was described by Francis Polkinghorne Pascoe in 1859. It is known from Australia.
