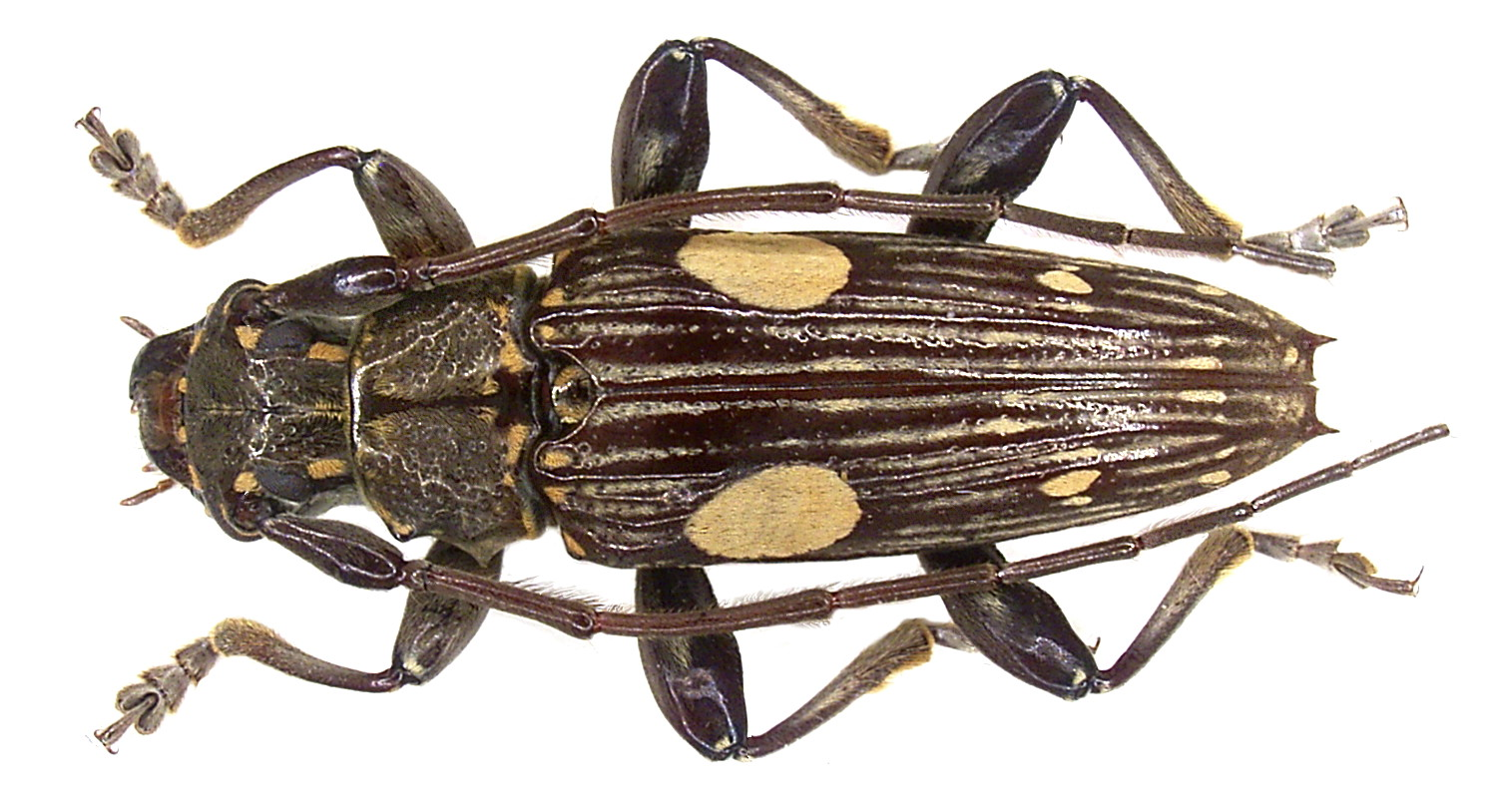

Scientific classification
- Domain: Eukaryota
- Kingdom: Animalia
- Phylum: Arthropoda
- Class: Insecta
- Order: Coleoptera
- Suborder: Polyphaga
- Infraorder: Cucujiformia
- Family: Cerambycidae
- Genus: Pascoea
- Species: P. degenerata

Binomial name
- Pascoea degenerata (Heller, 1914)

= Pascoea degenerata =

Species of beetle

Pascoea degenerata is a species of beetle in the family Cerambycidae. It was described by Heller in 1914.
