= Temnosternus mosaicus =

Scientific classification
- Domain: Eukaryota
- Kingdom: Animalia
- Phylum: Arthropoda
- Class: Insecta
- Order: Coleoptera
- Suborder: Polyphaga
- Infraorder: Cucujiformia
- Family: Cerambycidae
- Genus: Temnosternus
- Species: T. mosaicus

Binomial name
- Temnosternus mosaicus Slipinski & Escalona, 2013

Genus of beetles

Temnosternus mosaicus is a species of beetle in the family Cerambycidae. It was described by Slipinski & Escalona in 2013.
