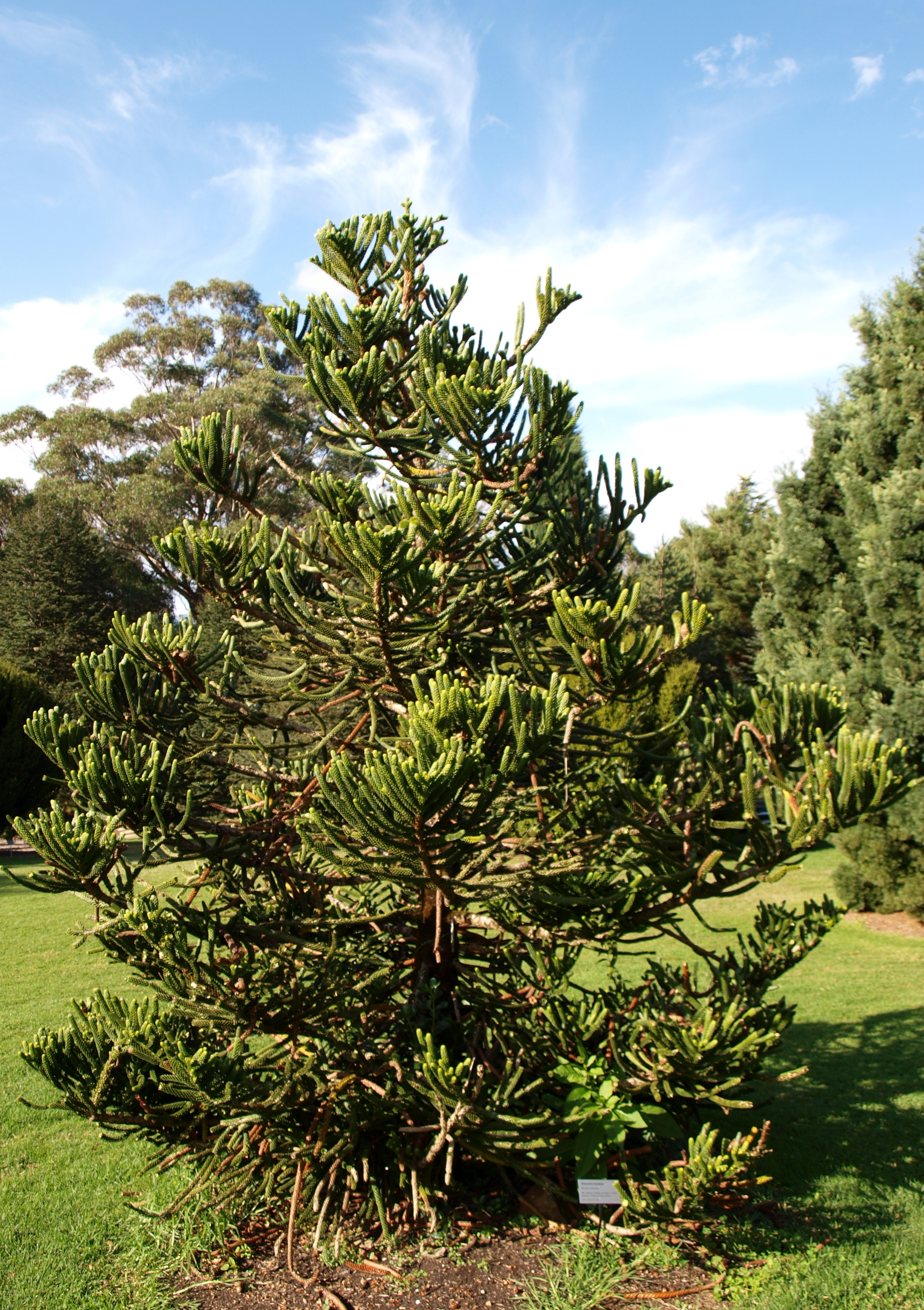
- Araucaria montana in Blue Mountains Botanic Garden

Conservation status
- Vulnerable (IUCN 3.1)

Scientific classification
- Kingdom: Plantae
- Clade: Tracheophytes
- Clade: Gymnosperms
- Division: Pinophyta
- Class: Pinopsida
- Order: Araucariales
- Family: Araucariaceae
- Genus: Araucaria
- Section: A. sect. Eutacta
- Species: A. montana

Binomial name
- Araucaria montana Brongn. & Gris

= Araucaria montana =

Species of conifer

Araucaria montana, the mountain araucaria, is a species of conifer in the family Araucariaceae. It is found only in New Caledonia.

Araucaria montana is the most widely distributed of New Caledonia's native Araucaria species, and is found throughout the main island of Grande Terre, as well as a small population on Île d'Art. However it is still considered vulnerable due to fragmentation of populations and degradation of habitat, due mainly to mining activities. Height of mature trees can vary from 10 to 40 meters. A population genetic study suggested that the less common A. laubenfelsii may not be distinct from A. montana. The Latin specific epithet montana refers to mountains or coming from mountains.

== Gallery ==
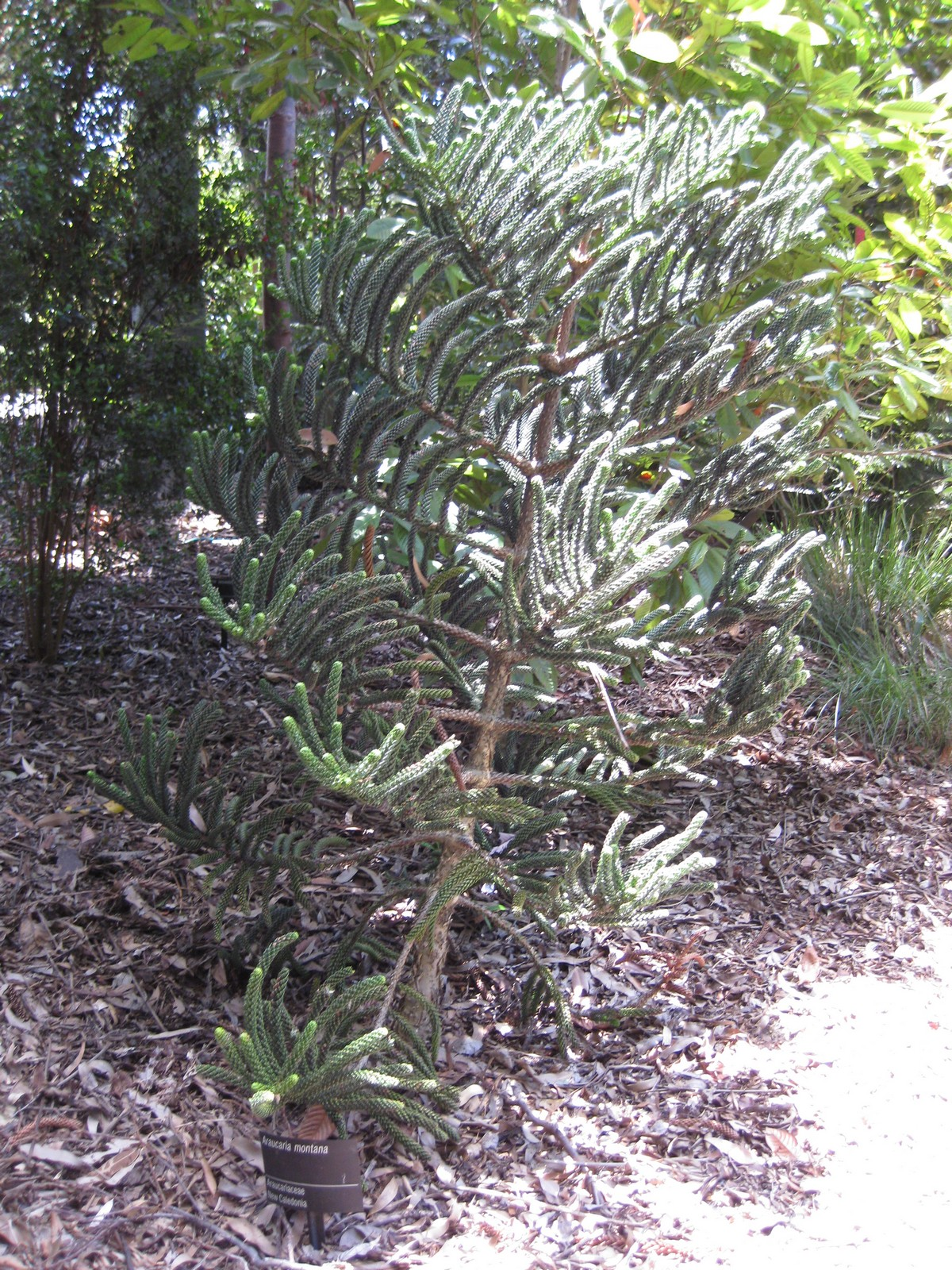
Araucaria montana at the Royal Botanic Gardens Melbourne

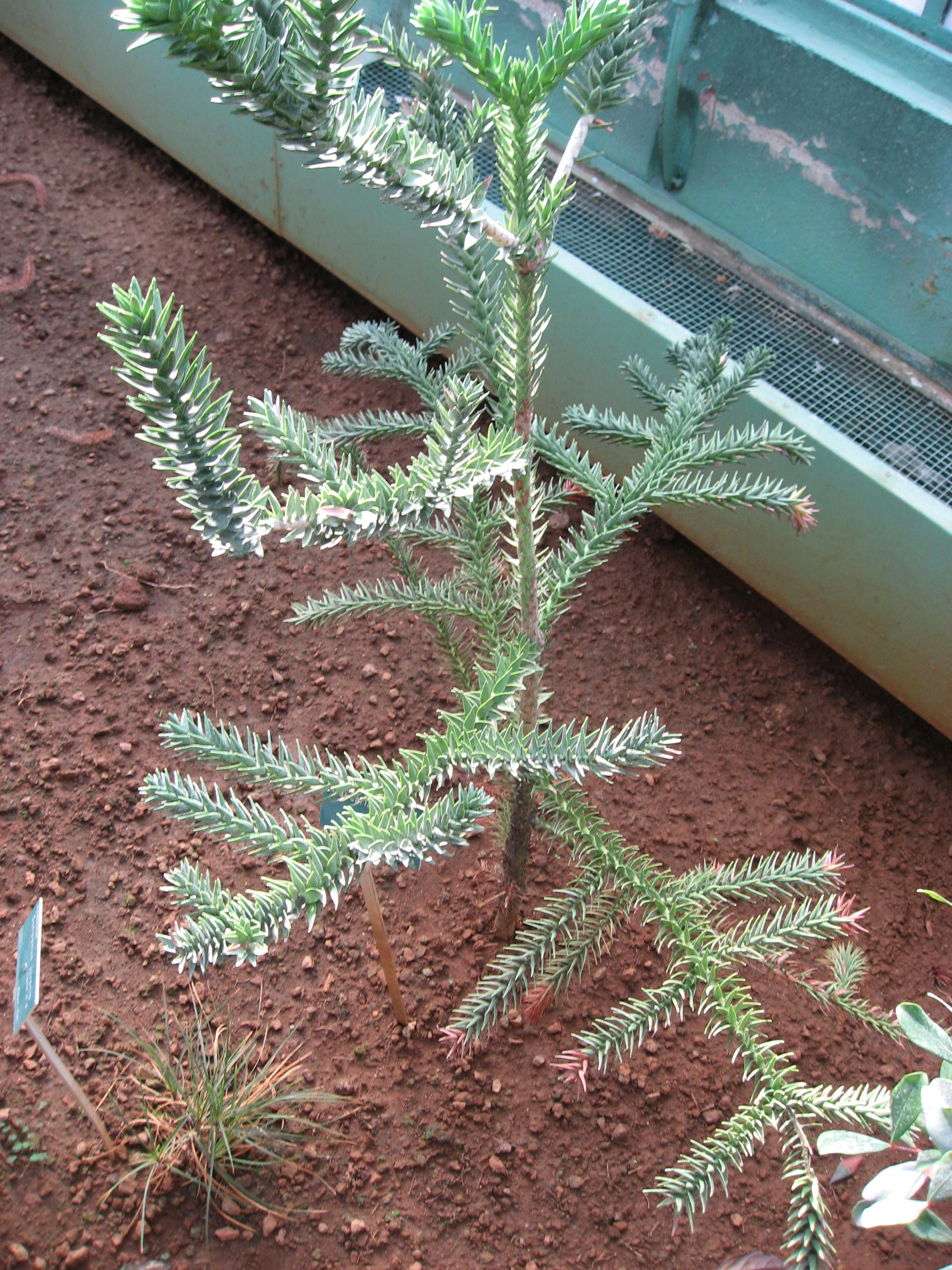
Araucaria montana indoors at Jardin des Serres d'Auteuil
