= Temnosternus subtruncatus =

Scientific classification
- Kingdom: Animalia
- Phylum: Arthropoda
- Class: Insecta
- Order: Coleoptera
- Suborder: Polyphaga
- Infraorder: Cucujiformia
- Family: Cerambycidae
- Genus: Temnosternus
- Species: T. subtruncatus

Binomial name
- Temnosternus subtruncatus (Breuning, 1948)

Species of beetle

Temnosternus subtruncatus is a species of beetle in the family Cerambycidae. It was described by Stephan von Breuning in 1948.
