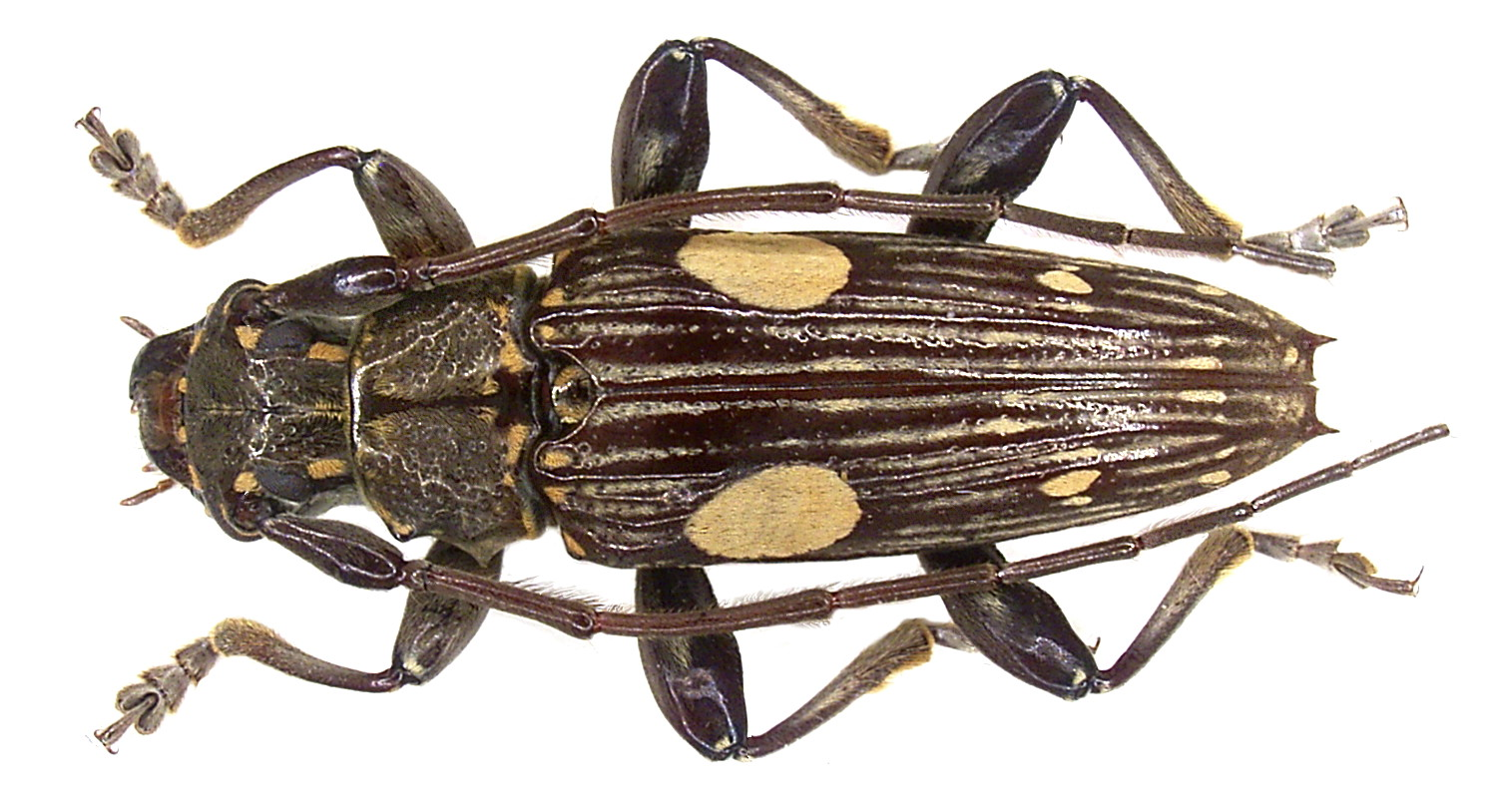
- Pascoea degenerata

Scientific classification
- Domain: Eukaryota
- Kingdom: Animalia
- Phylum: Arthropoda
- Class: Insecta
- Order: Coleoptera
- Suborder: Polyphaga
- Infraorder: Cucujiformia
- Family: Cerambycidae
- Tribe: Tmesisternini
- Genus: Pascoea

= Pascoea =

Genus of beetles

Pascoea is a genus of longhorn beetles of the subfamily Lamiinae, containing the following species:

- Pascoea angustana (Kriesche, 1923)
- Pascoea bilunata (Kriesche, 1923)
- Pascoea bimaculata (Gestro, 1876)
- Pascoea brunneoalba Gressitt, 1984
- Pascoea coeruleogrisea Breuning, 1950
- Pascoea degenerata (Heller, 1914)
- Pascoea dohrni (Fairmaire, 1833)
- Pascoea exarata (Pascoe, 1862)
- Pascoea idae White, 1855
- Pascoea meekei Breuning, 1966
- Pascoea mimica Gressitt, 1984
- Pascoea parcemaculata Breuning, 1948
- Pascoea spinicollis (Boisduval, 1835)
- Pascoea thoracica (Thomson, 1864)
- Pascoea torricelliana Gressitt, 1984
- Pascoea undulata Gressitt, 1984
