= Blapsilon purpureum =

Scientific classification
- Kingdom: Animalia
- Phylum: Arthropoda
- Class: Insecta
- Order: Coleoptera
- Suborder: Polyphaga
- Infraorder: Cucujiformia
- Family: Cerambycidae
- Genus: Blapsilon
- Species: B. purpureum

Binomial name
- Blapsilon purpureum Fauvel, 1906

Species of beetle

Blapsilon purpureum is a species of beetle in the family Cerambycidae. It was described by Fauvel in 1906. It is known from New Caledonia.
