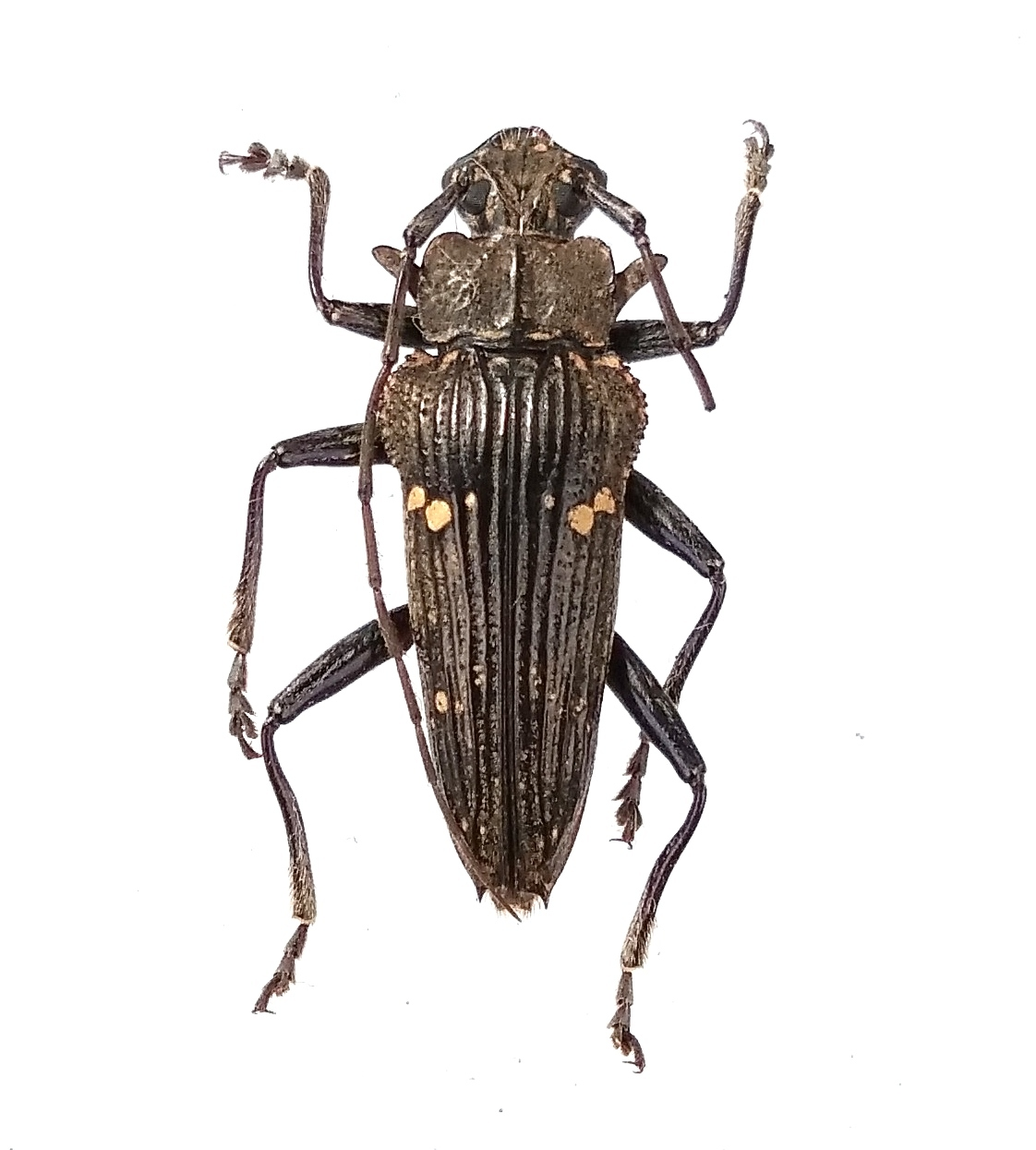

Scientific classification
- Domain: Eukaryota
- Kingdom: Animalia
- Phylum: Arthropoda
- Class: Insecta
- Order: Coleoptera
- Suborder: Polyphaga
- Infraorder: Cucujiformia
- Family: Cerambycidae
- Genus: Sepicana
- Species: S. hauseri

Binomial name
- Sepicana hauseri (Aurivillius, 1907)

= Sepicana hauseri =

Species of beetle

Sepicana hauseri is a species of beetle in the family Cerambycidae. It was described by Per Olof Christopher Aurivillius in 1907.
