= Blapsilon irroratum =

Scientific classification
- Kingdom: Animalia
- Phylum: Arthropoda
- Class: Insecta
- Order: Coleoptera
- Suborder: Polyphaga
- Infraorder: Cucujiformia
- Family: Cerambycidae
- Genus: Blapsilon
- Species: B. irroratum

Binomial name
- Blapsilon irroratum Pascoe, 1860

Synonyms
- Blapsilon kaszabi Breuning, 1978; Blapsilon scutellare Fauvel, 1906; Lamia scutellata Montrouzier, 1861

Species of beetle

Blapsilon irroratum is a species of beetle in the family Cerambycidae. It was described by Francis Polkinghorne Pascoe in 1860. It is known from New Caledonia.
