= Pascoea bimaculata =

Scientific classification
- Domain: Eukaryota
- Kingdom: Animalia
- Phylum: Arthropoda
- Class: Insecta
- Order: Coleoptera
- Suborder: Polyphaga
- Infraorder: Cucujiformia
- Family: Cerambycidae
- Genus: Pascoea
- Species: P. bimaculata

Binomial name
- Pascoea bimaculata (Gestro, 1876)

Species of beetle

Pascoea bimaculata is a species of beetle in the family Cerambycidae. It was described by Gestro in 1876.
