= Sepicana migsominea =

Scientific classification
- Domain: Eukaryota
- Kingdom: Animalia
- Phylum: Arthropoda
- Class: Insecta
- Order: Coleoptera
- Suborder: Polyphaga
- Infraorder: Cucujiformia
- Family: Cerambycidae
- Genus: Sepicana
- Species: S. migsominea

Binomial name
- Sepicana migsominea Gilmour, 1949

Species of beetle

Sepicana migsominea is a species of beetle in the family Cerambycidae. It was described by E. Forrest Gilmour in 1949.
