= Blapsilon viridicolle =

Scientific classification
- Kingdom: Animalia
- Phylum: Arthropoda
- Class: Insecta
- Order: Coleoptera
- Suborder: Polyphaga
- Infraorder: Cucujiformia
- Family: Cerambycidae
- Genus: Blapsilon
- Species: B. viridicolle

Binomial name
- Blapsilon viridicolle (Chevrolat, 1858)

Synonyms
- Lamia (?Penthea) metallica Montrouzier, 1861; Tmesisternus viridicollis Chevrolat, 1858

Species of beetle

Blapsilon viridicolle is a species of beetle in the family Cerambycidae. It was described by Chevrolat in 1858, originally under the genus Tmesisternus. It is known from New Caledonia.
