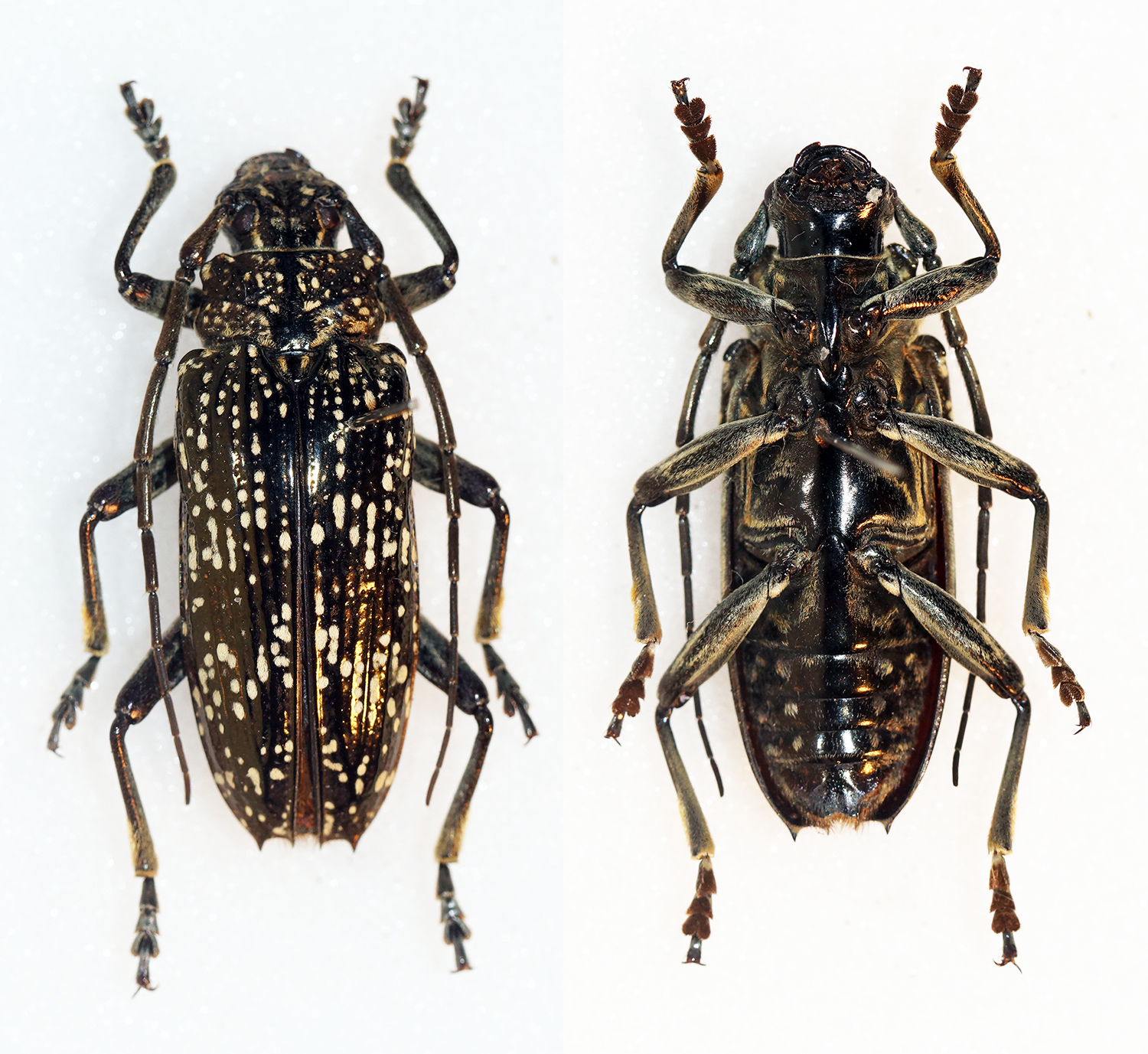

Scientific classification
- Kingdom: Animalia
- Phylum: Arthropoda
- Class: Insecta
- Order: Coleoptera
- Suborder: Polyphaga
- Infraorder: Cucujiformia
- Family: Cerambycidae
- Genus: Sphingnotus
- Species: S. dunningi

Binomial name
- Sphingnotus dunningi Pascoe, 1867

= Sphingnotus dunningi =

Species of beetle

Sphingnotus dunningi is a species of beetle in the family Cerambycidae. It was described by Francis Polkinghorne Pascoe in 1867. It is known from Moluccas.

== Subspecies ==
- Sphingnotus dunningi gazellus Gressitt, 1984
- Sphingnotus dunningi dunningi Pascoe, 1867
- Sphingnotus dunningi costipennis Breuning, 1950
- Sphingnotus dunningi regius Kriesche, 1928
