= Blapsilon =

Scientific classification
- Kingdom: Animalia
- Phylum: Arthropoda
- Class: Insecta
- Order: Coleoptera
- Suborder: Polyphaga
- Infraorder: Cucujiformia
- Family: Cerambycidae
- Subfamily: Lamiinae
- Tribe: Tmesisternini
- Genus: Blapsilon; Pascoe, 1860

Genus of beetles

Blapsilon is a genus of longhorn beetles of the subfamily Lamiinae, containing the following species:

- Blapsilon austrocaledonicum (Montrouzier, 1861)
- Blapsilon irroratum Pascoe, 1860
- Blapsilon montrouzieri Thomson, 1865
- Blapsilon purpureum Fauvel, 1906
- Blapsilon viridicolle (Chevrolat, 1858)
