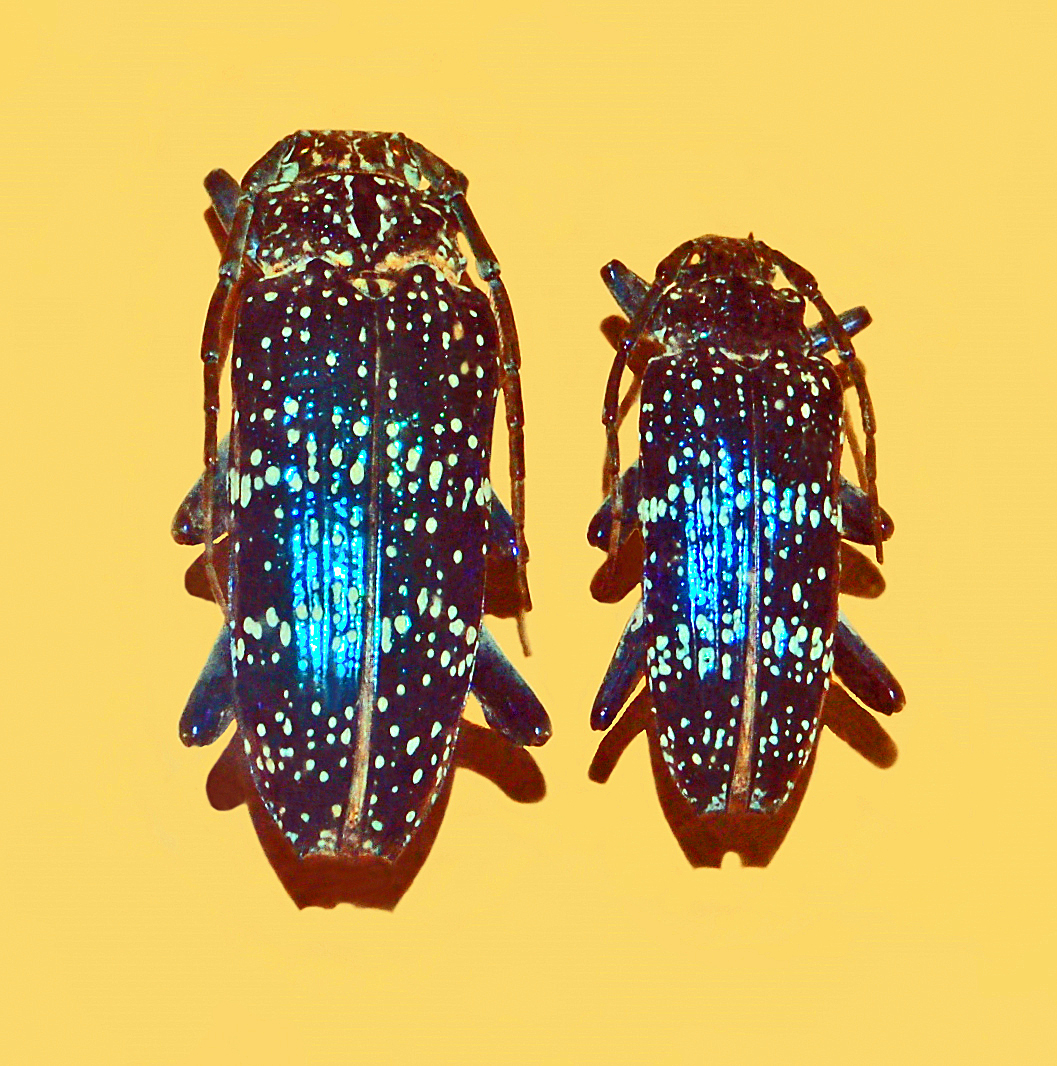
- Sphingnotus insignis albertisi from New Guinea

Scientific classification
- Domain: Eukaryota
- Kingdom: Animalia
- Phylum: Arthropoda
- Class: Insecta
- Order: Coleoptera
- Suborder: Polyphaga
- Infraorder: Cucujiformia
- Family: Cerambycidae
- Genus: Sphingnotus
- Species: S. insignis

Binomial name
- Sphingnotus insignis Perroud, 1855

Synonyms
- Sphingnotus albertisi Gestro, 1876

= Sphingnotus insignis =

Species of beetle

Sphingnotus insignis is a species of beetle belonging to the family Cerambycidae.

== Description ==
Sphingnotus insignis can reach a length of 23–38 millimetres (0.91–1.50 in). Head, prothorax and elitra have a brilliant metallic blue colour and bear small white spots. The surface has an irregular puntation arranged in longitudinal lines.

== Distribution ==
This species can be found in New Guinea.

== List of subspecies ==
- Sphingnotus insignis albertisi Gestro, 1876
- Sphingnotus insignis ammiralis Breuning, 1945
- Sphingnotus insignis insignis Perroud, 1855
