= Temnosternus vitulus =

Scientific classification
- Domain: Eukaryota
- Kingdom: Animalia
- Phylum: Arthropoda
- Class: Insecta
- Order: Coleoptera
- Suborder: Polyphaga
- Infraorder: Cucujiformia
- Family: Cerambycidae
- Genus: Temnosternus
- Species: T. vitulus

Binomial name
- Temnosternus vitulus Pascoe, 1871

Species of beetle

Temnosternus vitulus is a species of beetle in the family Cerambycidae. It was described by Francis Polkinghorne Pascoe in 1871. It is known from Australia.
