= Pascoea dohrni =

Scientific classification
- Kingdom: Animalia
- Phylum: Arthropoda
- Class: Insecta
- Order: Coleoptera
- Suborder: Polyphaga
- Infraorder: Cucujiformia
- Family: Cerambycidae
- Genus: Pascoea
- Species: P. dohrni

Binomial name
- Pascoea dohrni (Fairmaire, 1833)

Species of beetle

Pascoea dohrni is a species of beetle in the family Cerambycidae. It was described by Léon Fairmaire in 1833.
