= Temnosternus ochreopictus =

Scientific classification
- Kingdom: Animalia
- Phylum: Arthropoda
- Class: Insecta
- Order: Coleoptera
- Suborder: Polyphaga
- Infraorder: Cucujiformia
- Family: Cerambycidae
- Genus: Temnosternus
- Species: T. ochreopictus

Binomial name
- Temnosternus ochreopictus (Breuning, 1961)

Species of beetle

Temnosternus ochreopictus is a species of beetle in the family Cerambycidae. It was described by Stephan von Breuning in 1961.
