= Pascoea meekei =

Scientific classification
- Kingdom: Animalia
- Phylum: Arthropoda
- Class: Insecta
- Order: Coleoptera
- Suborder: Polyphaga
- Infraorder: Cucujiformia
- Family: Cerambycidae
- Genus: Pascoea
- Species: P. meekei

Binomial name
- Pascoea meekei Breuning, 1966

Species of beetle

Pascoea meekei is a species of beetle in the family Cerambycidae. It was described by Stephan von Breuning in 1966.
