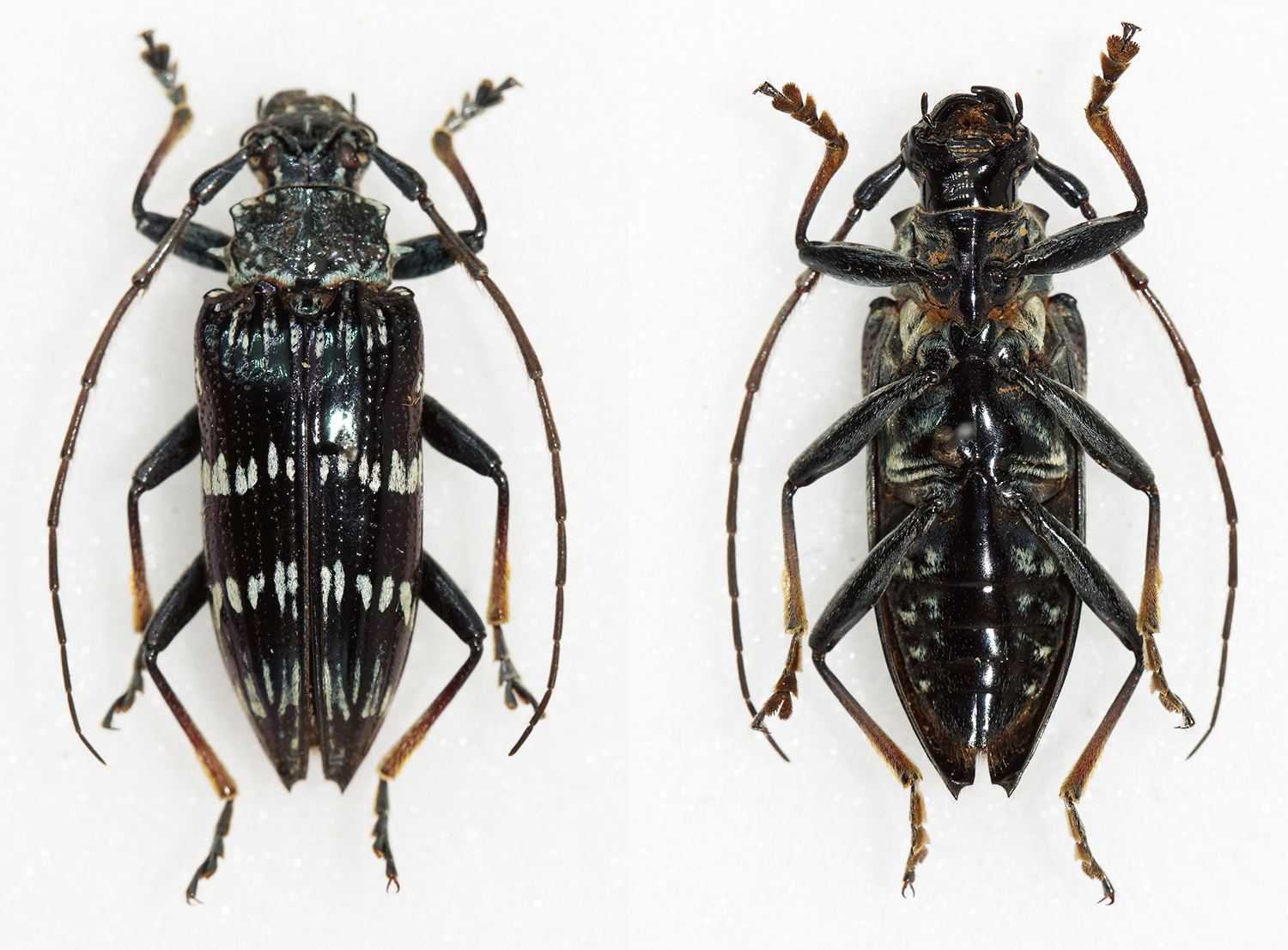

Scientific classification
- Kingdom: Animalia
- Phylum: Arthropoda
- Class: Insecta
- Order: Coleoptera
- Suborder: Polyphaga
- Infraorder: Cucujiformia
- Family: Cerambycidae
- Genus: Pascoea
- Species: P. idae

Binomial name
- Pascoea idae White, 1855

= Pascoea idae =

Species of beetle

Pascoea idae is a species of beetle in the family Cerambycidae. It was described by White in 1855. It is known from Moluccas.
