= Sepicana armata =

Scientific classification
- Domain: Eukaryota
- Kingdom: Animalia
- Phylum: Arthropoda
- Class: Insecta
- Order: Coleoptera
- Suborder: Polyphaga
- Infraorder: Cucujiformia
- Family: Cerambycidae
- Genus: Sepicana
- Species: S. armata

Binomial name
- Sepicana armata (Montrouzier, 1855)

Species of beetle

Sepicana armata is a species of beetle in the family Cerambycidae. It was described by Xavier Montrouzier in 1855.
