= Pascoea exarata =

Scientific classification
- Kingdom: Animalia
- Phylum: Arthropoda
- Class: Insecta
- Order: Coleoptera
- Suborder: Polyphaga
- Infraorder: Cucujiformia
- Family: Cerambycidae
- Genus: Pascoea
- Species: P. exarata

Binomial name
- Pascoea exarata (Pascoe, 1862)

Synonyms
- Elais detznei Kriesche, 1923; Elais exarata (Pascoe) Pascoe, 1867; Tmesisternus exaratus Pascoe, 1862

Species of beetle

Pascoea exarata is a species of beetle in the family Cerambycidae. It was described by Francis Polkinghorne Pascoe in 1862, and is known from Moluccas.
