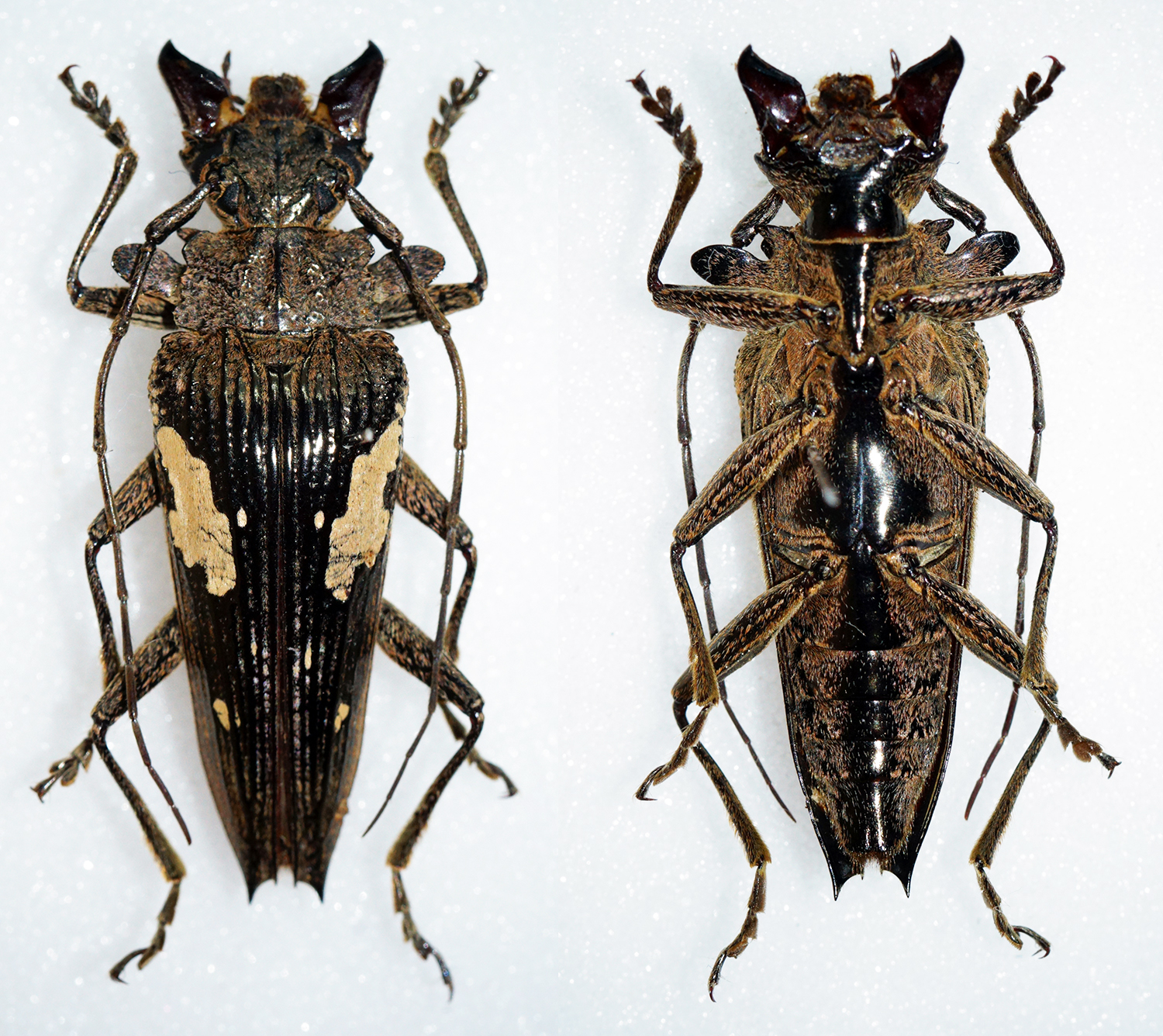

Scientific classification
- Kingdom: Animalia
- Phylum: Arthropoda
- Class: Insecta
- Order: Coleoptera
- Suborder: Polyphaga
- Infraorder: Cucujiformia
- Family: Cerambycidae
- Genus: Sepicana
- Species: S. arfakensis

Binomial name
- Sepicana arfakensis Breuning, 1950

= Sepicana arfakensis =

Species of beetle

Sepicana arfakensis is a species of beetle in the family Cerambycidae. It was described by Stephan von Breuning in 1950. It is known from Indonesia.
