= Sepicana albomaculata =

Scientific classification
- Domain: Eukaryota
- Kingdom: Animalia
- Phylum: Arthropoda
- Class: Insecta
- Order: Coleoptera
- Suborder: Polyphaga
- Infraorder: Cucujiformia
- Family: Cerambycidae
- Genus: Sepicana
- Species: S. albomaculata

Binomial name
- Sepicana albomaculata (Gahan, 1915)

Species of beetle

Sepicana albomaculata is a species of beetle in the family Cerambycidae. It was described by Charles Joseph Gahan in 1915.
