= Epiblapsilon =

Scientific classification
- Kingdom: Animalia
- Phylum: Arthropoda
- Class: Insecta
- Order: Coleoptera
- Suborder: Polyphaga
- Infraorder: Cucujiformia
- Family: Cerambycidae
- Genus: Epiblapsilon
- Species: E. tuberculatum

Binomial name
- Epiblapsilon tuberculatum Gressitt, 1984

Genus of beetles

Epiblapsilon tuberculatum is a species of beetle in the family Cerambycidae, and the only species in the genus Epiblapsilon. It was described by Gressitt in 1984.
