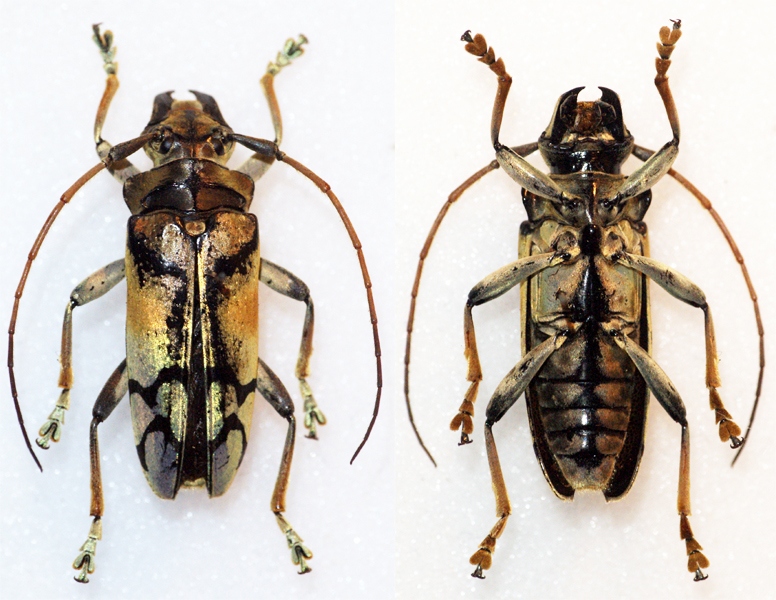

Scientific classification
- Kingdom: Animalia
- Phylum: Arthropoda
- Class: Insecta
- Order: Coleoptera
- Suborder: Polyphaga
- Infraorder: Cucujiformia
- Family: Cerambycidae
- Genus: Sulawesiella
- Species: S. rafaelae

Binomial name
- Sulawesiella rafaelae (Lansberge, 1885)

= Sulawesiella =

Genus of beetles

Sulawesiella rafaelae is a species of beetle in the family Cerambycidae, and the only species in the genus Sulawesiella. It was described by Lansberge in 1885.
