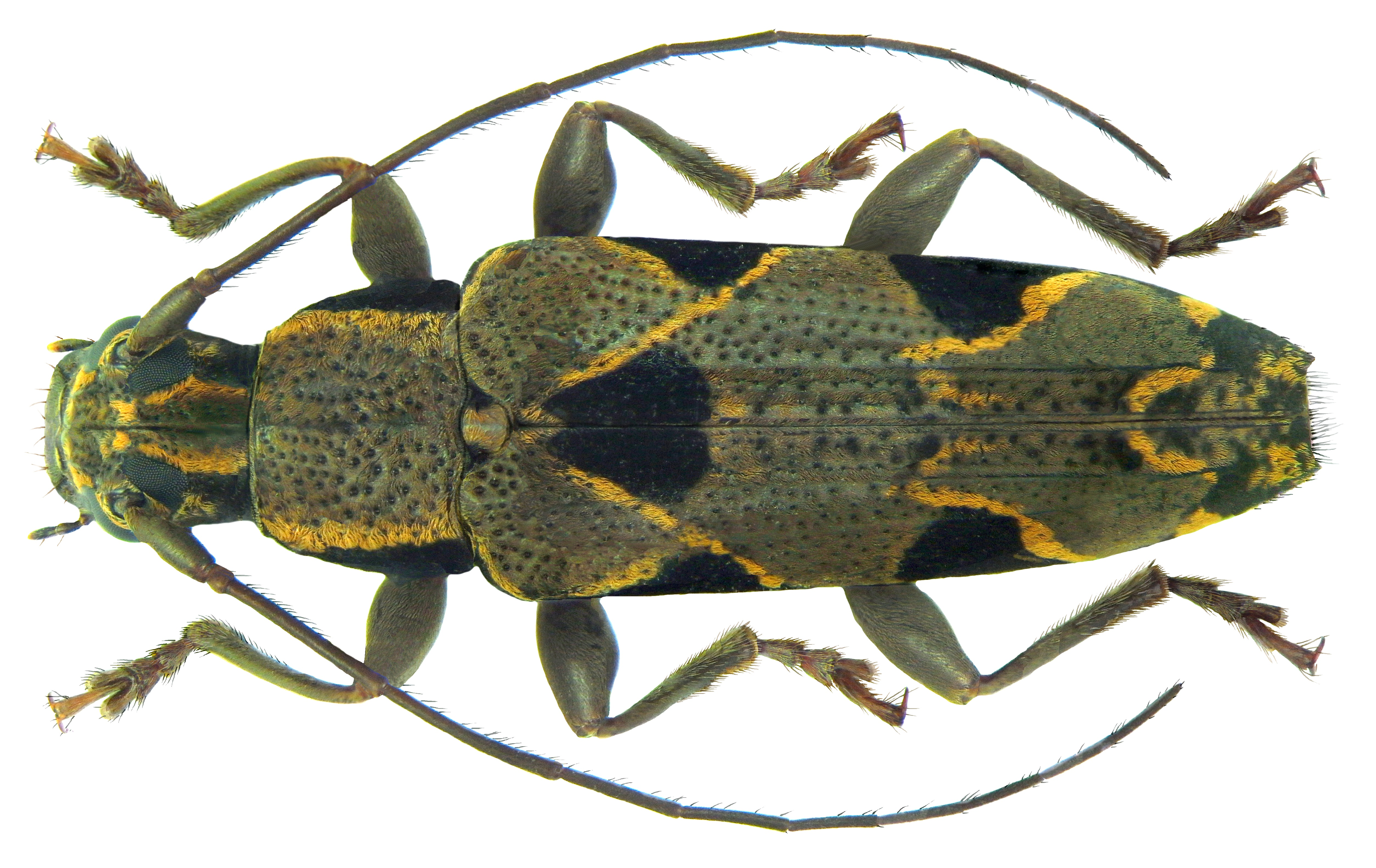

Scientific classification
- Domain: Eukaryota
- Kingdom: Animalia
- Phylum: Arthropoda
- Class: Insecta
- Order: Coleoptera
- Suborder: Polyphaga
- Infraorder: Cucujiformia
- Family: Cerambycidae
- Genus: Tmesisternus
- Species: T. distinctus

Binomial name
- Tmesisternus distinctus Boisduval, 1835

= Tmesisternus distinctus =

Species of beetle

Tmesisternus distinctus is a species of beetle in the family Cerambycidae. It was described by Jean Baptiste Boisduval in 1835.

== Subspecies ==
- Tmesisternus distinctus distinctus Boisduval, 1835
- Tmesisternus distinctus contraversus Pascoe, 1867
- Tmesisternus distinctus electus Heller, 1914
