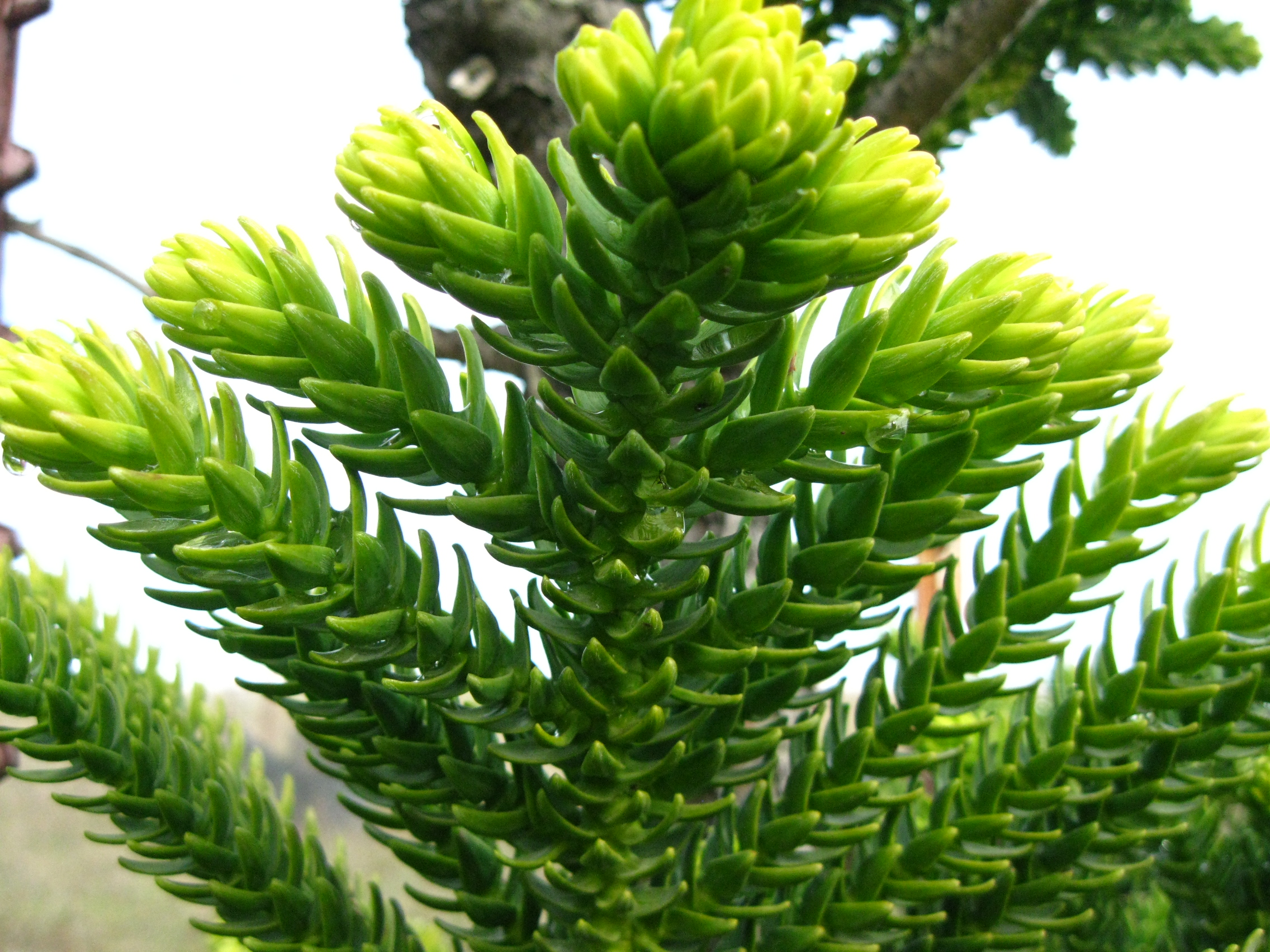

Conservation status
- Near Threatened (IUCN 3.1)

Scientific classification
- Kingdom: Plantae
- Clade: Tracheophytes
- Clade: Gymnosperms
- Division: Pinophyta
- Class: Pinopsida
- Order: Araucariales
- Family: Araucariaceae
- Genus: Araucaria
- Section: A. sect. Eutacta
- Species: A. laubenfelsii

Binomial name
- Araucaria laubenfelsii Corbasson

Synonyms
- Eutassa laubenfelsii (Corbasson) de Laub.

= Araucaria laubenfelsii =

Species of conifer

Araucaria laubenfelsii (De Laubenfels' Araucaria) is a species of conifer in the family Araucariaceae. It is found only on Grande Terre, the main island of New Caledonia, mainly on the southern mountains Mont Mou, Mont des Sources, Mont Dzumac and Mont Dou, though smaller populations also exist on Mont Kaala and Mont Canala in the north. It is one of the larger of New Caledonia's native araucaria species, sometimes reaching up to 50 meters in height in emergent rainforest specimens, and potentially living for as long as 500 years or more. As with other New Caledonian Araucaria species, Araucaria laubenfelsii is threatened by habitat loss, though southern populations at least are considered to be healthy and it is not currently considered vulnerable or endangered. A population genetic study suggested that A. laubenfelsii is doubtfully distinct from the more widespread A. montana.
