= List of Rutaceae genera =

As of July 2025, Plants of the World Online (PoWO) accepted 151 genera in the family Rutaceae. The Angiosperm Phylogeny Website (APweb) also accepted about 150 genera, but with some genera accepted by PoWO not accepted and some extra genera. About 140 genera were common to the two lists. The list below is based on PoWO, with placements in APWeb shown in parentheses.

== A ==
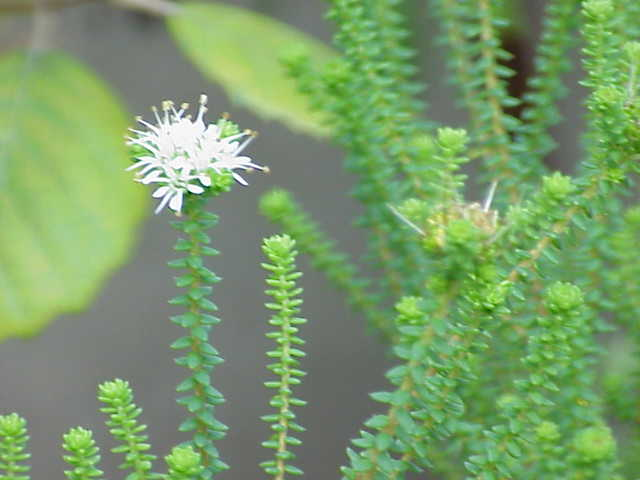
Agathosma apiculata

- Acmadenia Bartl. & H.L.Wendl.
- Acradenia Kippist
- Acronychia J.R.Forst. & G.Forst. - lemon aspen
- Adenandra Willd.
- Adiscanthus Ducke
- Aegle Corrêa - bael
- Aeglopsis Swingle
- Afraegle Engl.
- Afraurantium A.Chev.
- Agathosma Willd.
- Amyris P.Browne - West Indian sandalwood
- Andreadoxa Kallunki
- Angostura Roem. & Schult.
- Apocaulon R.S.Cowan
- Asterolasia F.Muell.
- Atalantia Corrêa

== B ==
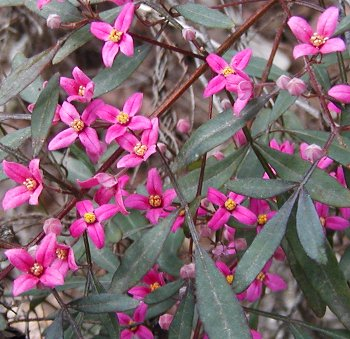
Fraser's Boronia (Boronia fraseri)

- Balfourodendron Mello ex Oliv.
- Balsamocitrus Stapf
- Bergera J.Koenig ex L.
- Boenninghausenia Rchb. ex Meisn.
- Boronia Sm.
- Bosistoa F.Muell. ex Benth. - bonewoods
- Bottegoa Chiov.
- Bouchardatia Baill.
- Bouzetia Montrouz., synonym of Suriana in family Surianaceae
- Brombya F.Muell.
- Burkillanthus Swingle

== C ==
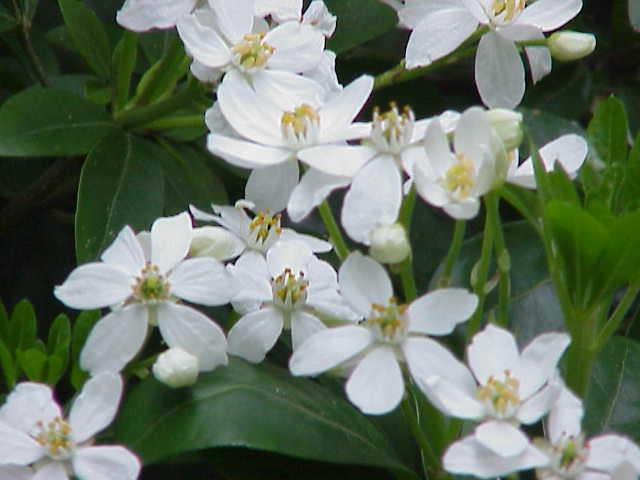
Mexican Orange Blossom (Choisya ternata)

- Calodendrum Thunb.
- Casimiroa La Llave
- Cedrelopsis Baill.
- Chloroxylon DC.
- Choisya Kunth - Mexican orange
- Chorilaena Endl.
- Citropsis (Engl.) Swingle & M.Kellerm. - African orange cherry
- Citrus L.
- Clausena Burm.f.
- Clymenia Swingle (may be included in Citrus)
- Cneoridium Hook.f.
- Cneorum L. (formerly in Cneoraceae)
- Coleonema Bartl. & H.L.Wendl. - breath of heaven
- Comptonella Baker f. (may be included in Melicope)
- Conchocarpus J.C.Mikan
- Correa Andrews
- Crossosperma T.G.Hartley
- Crowea Sm.
- Cyanothamnus Lindl.

== D ==
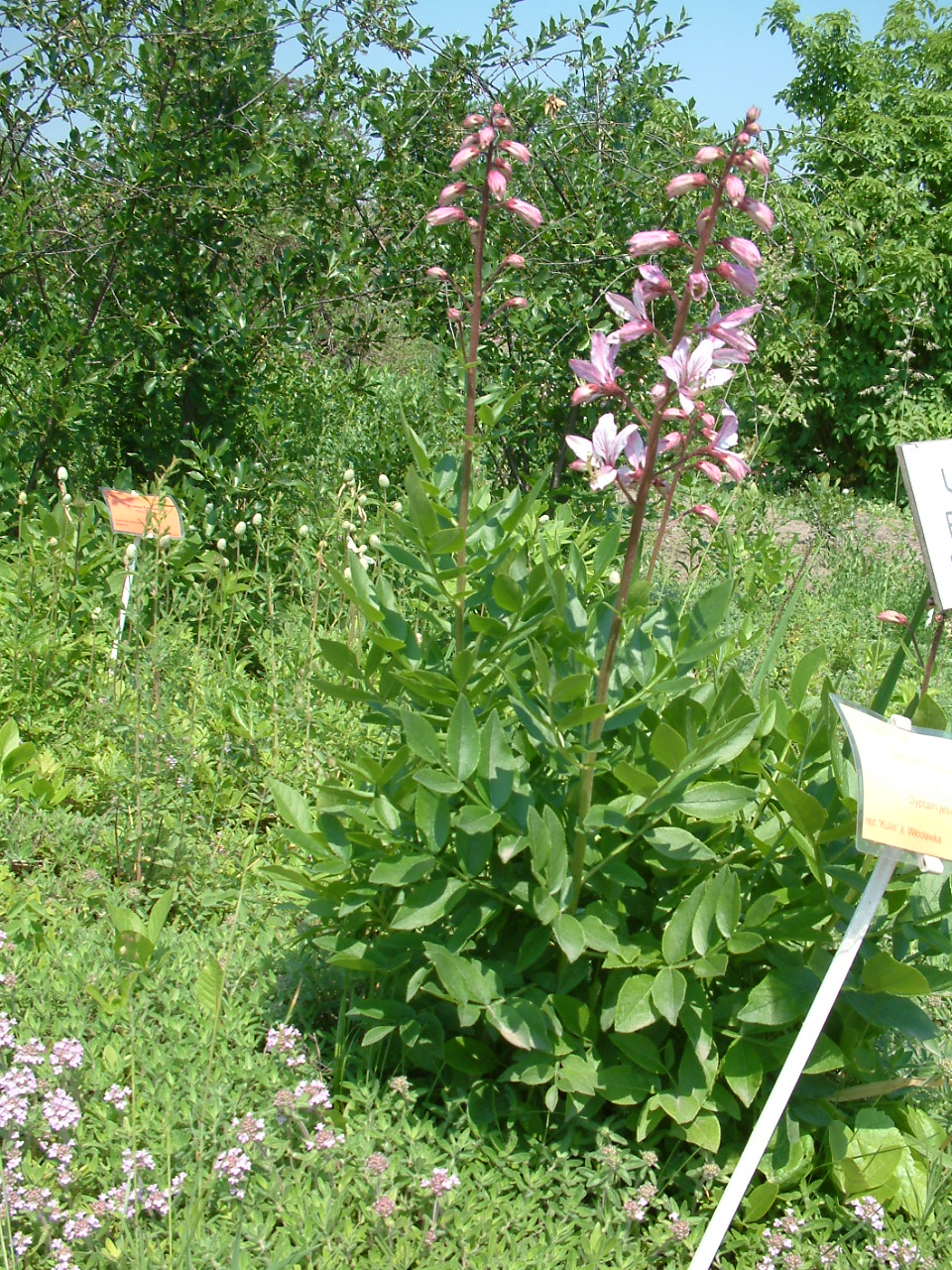
Burning-bush (Dictamnus albus)

- Decagonocarpus Engl.
- Decatropis Hook.f.
- Decazyx Pittier & S.F.Blake
- Dendrosma Pancher & Sebert, synonym of Geijera
- Desmotes Kallunki
- Dictamnus L. - burning-bush
- Dictyoloma A.Juss.
- Diphasia Pierre, synonym of Vepris
- Dinosperma T.G.Hartley
- Diosma L.
- Diplolaena R.Br.
- Drummondita Harv.
- Dryades Groppo, Kallunki & Pirani
- Dutailliopsis T.G.Hartley
- Dutaillyea Baill. (may be included in Melicope)

== E ==
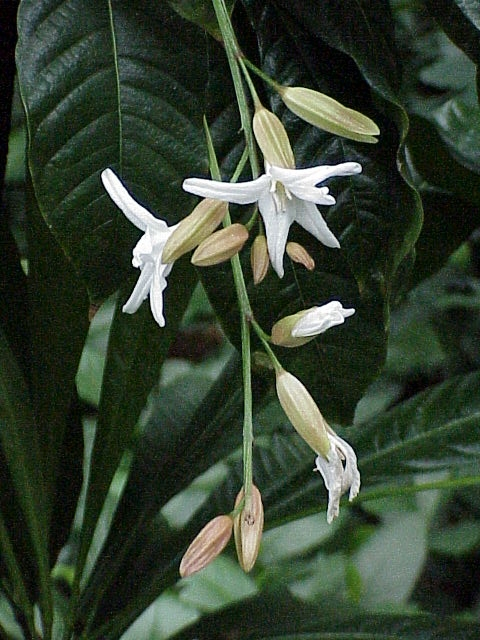
Erythrochiton brasiliensis

- Empleurum Aiton
- Eriostemon Sm.
- Ertela Adans.
- Erythrochiton Nees & Mart.
- Esenbeckia Kunth
- Euchaetis Bartl. & H.L.Wendl.
- Euodia J.R.Forst. & G.Forst.
- Euxylophora Huber

== F ==
- Fagaropsis Mildbr. – crow ash, cudgerie
- Feroniella Swingle
- Flindersia R.Br.

== G ==
- Galipea Aubl.
- Geijera Schott - wilga, axebreakers
- Geleznowia Turcz.
- Glycosmis Corrêa

== H ==
- Halfordia F.Muell.
- Haplophyllum A.Juss.
- Harrisonia R.Br. ex A.Juss.
- Helietta Tul.
- Hortia Vand.

== I ==
- Ivodea Capuron

== L ==
- Leionema (F.Muell.) Paul G.Wilson
- Leptothyrsa Hook.f.
- Limnocitrus Swingle, synonym of Pleiospermium
- Limonia L.
- Lubaria Pittier
- Lunasia Blanco
- Luvunga Buch.-Ham. ex Wight & Arn.

== M ==
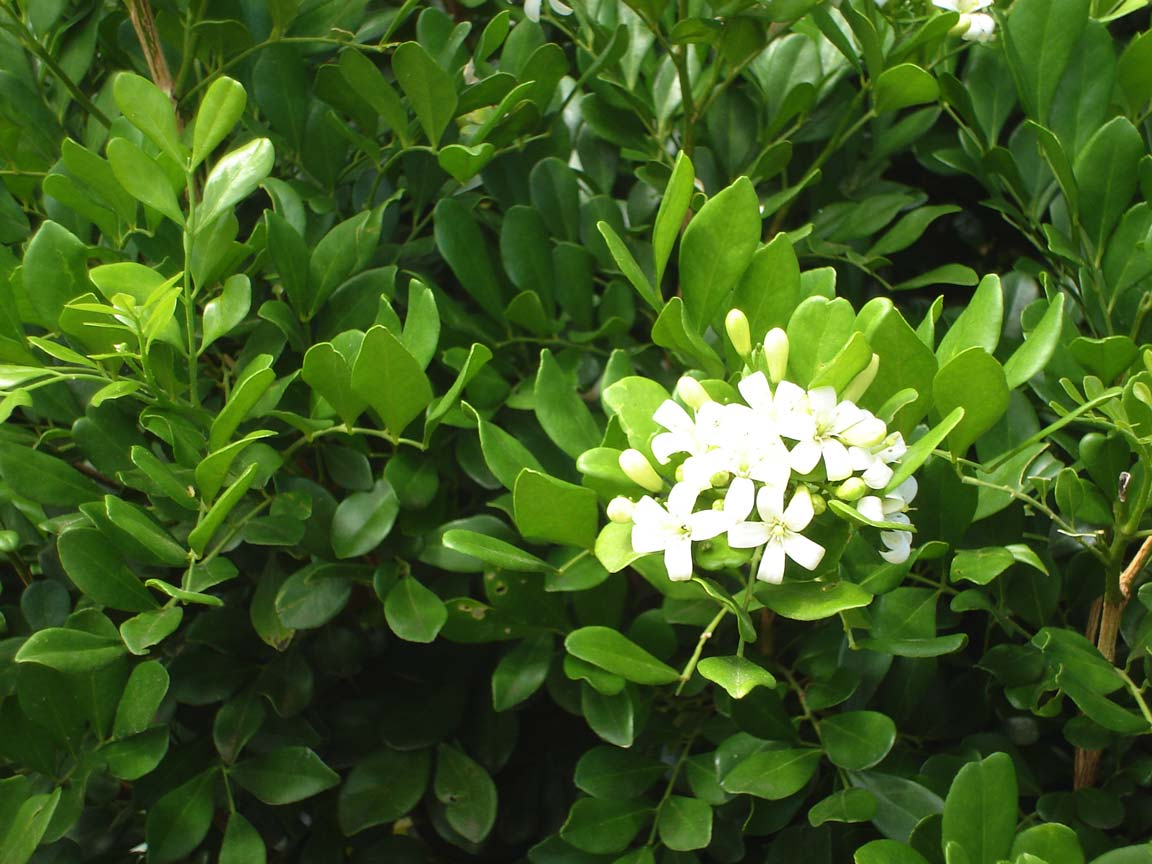
Orange Jessamine (Murraya paniculata)

- Maclurodendron T.G.Hartley (may be included in Acronychia)
- Macrostylis Bartl. & H.L.Wendl.
- Medicosma Hook.f.
- Megastigma Hook.f.
- Melicope J.R.Forst. & G.Forst. - corkwood, alani
- Merope M.Roem.
- Merrillia Swingle
- Metrodorea A.St.-Hil.
- Microcybe Turcz. – synonym of Phebalium Vent.
- Micromelum Blume
- Monanthocitrus Tanaka
- Muiriantha C.A.Gardner
- Murraya J.Koenig ex L.
- Myrtopsis Engl.

== N ==
- Naringi Adans.
- Naudinia Planch. & Linden
- Nematolepis Turcz.
- Neobyrnesia J.A.Armstr.
- Neoraputia Emmerich ex Kallunki
- Neoschmidia T.G.Hartley

== O ==
- Oricia Pierre, synonym of Vepris
- Oriciopsis Engl., synonym of Vepris
- Orixa Thunb.
- Oxanthera Montrouz., synonym of Citrus

== P ==
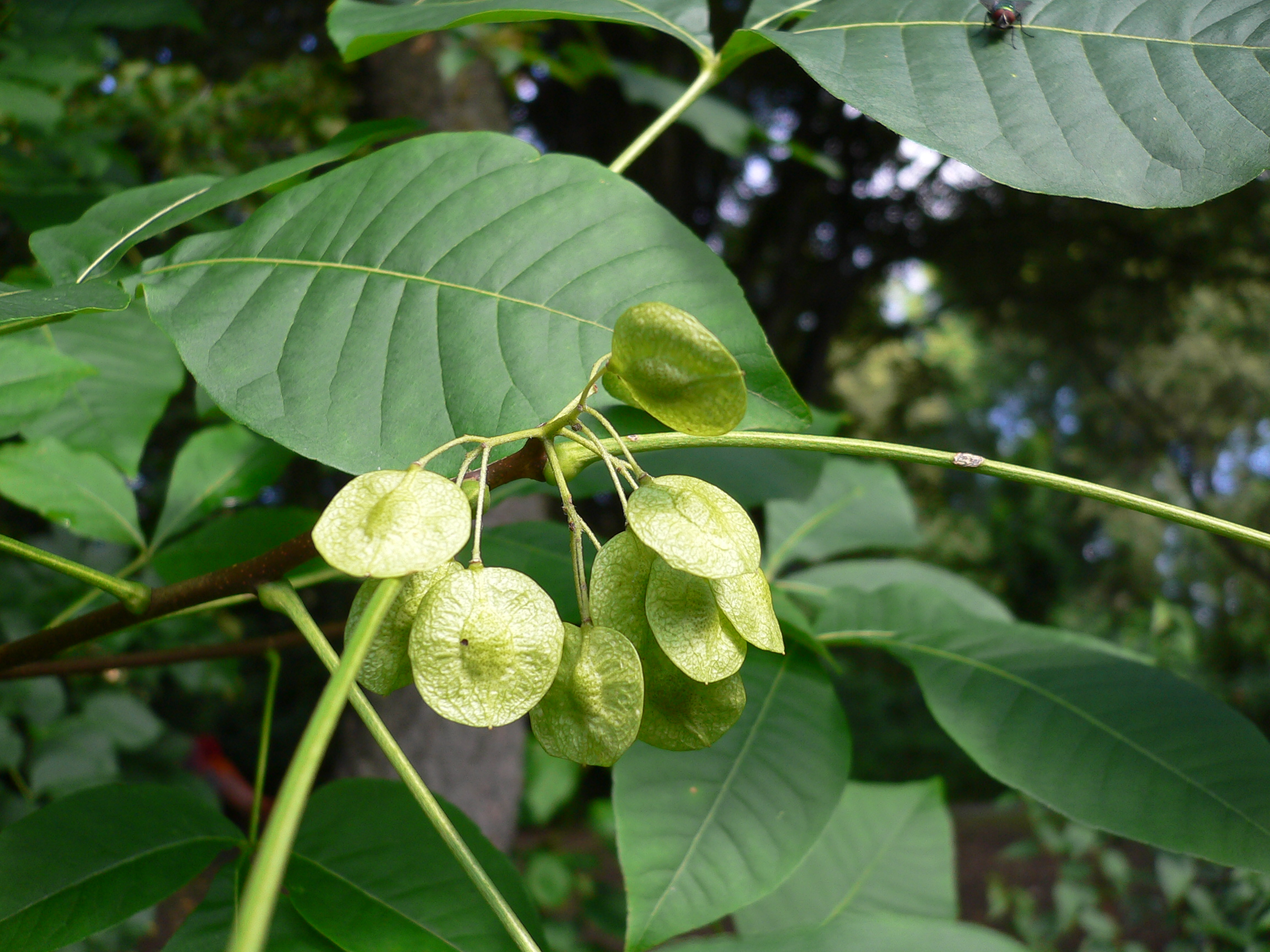
Hoptree (Ptelea trifoliata)

- Pamburus Swingle
- Paramignya Wight
- Peltostigma Walp.
- Pentaceras Hook.f.
- Perryodendron T.G.Hartley
- Phebalium Vent.
- Phellodendron Rupr. - cork-tree
- Philotheca Rudge
- Phyllosma Bolus ex Schltr.
- Picrella Baill. (may be included in Melicope)
- Pilocarpus Vahl
- Pitavia Molina
- Pitaviaster T.G.Hartley (may be included in Melicope)
- Platydesma H.Mann, synonym of Melicope
- Pleiospermium Swingle
- Plethadenia Urb.
- Polyaster Hook.f.
- Psilopeganum Hemsl.
- Ptaeroxylon Eckl. & Zeyh. - sneezewood tree
- Ptelea L.

== R ==
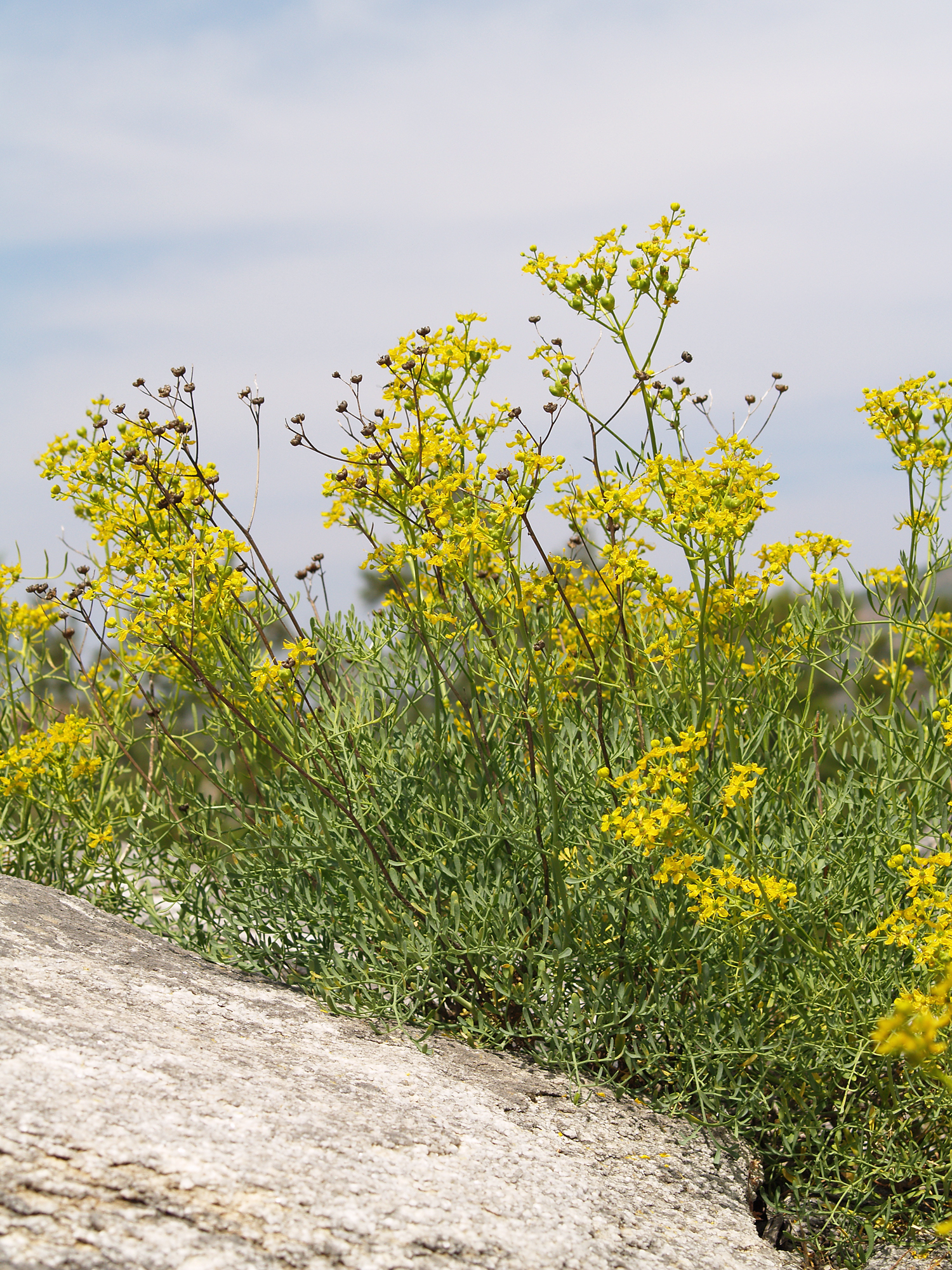
Common Rue (Ruta graveolens)

- Raputia Aubl.
- Raputiarana Emmerich
- Rauia Nees & Mart.
- Raulinoa R.S.Cowan
- Ravenia Vell.
- Raveniopsis Gleason
- Rhadinothamnus Paul G.Wilson – synonym of Chorilaena Endl.
- Ruta L.
- Rutaneblina Steyerm. & Luteyn

== S ==
- Sarcomelicope Engl. (may be included in Melicope)
- Severinia Ten., synonym of Atalantia
- Sheilanthera I.Williams
- Sigmatanthus Huber ex Emmerich
- Skimmia Thunb.
- Sohnreyia K.Krause
- Spathelia L.
- Spiranthera A.St.-Hil.
- Stauranthus Liebm.
- Swinglea Merr.

== T ==
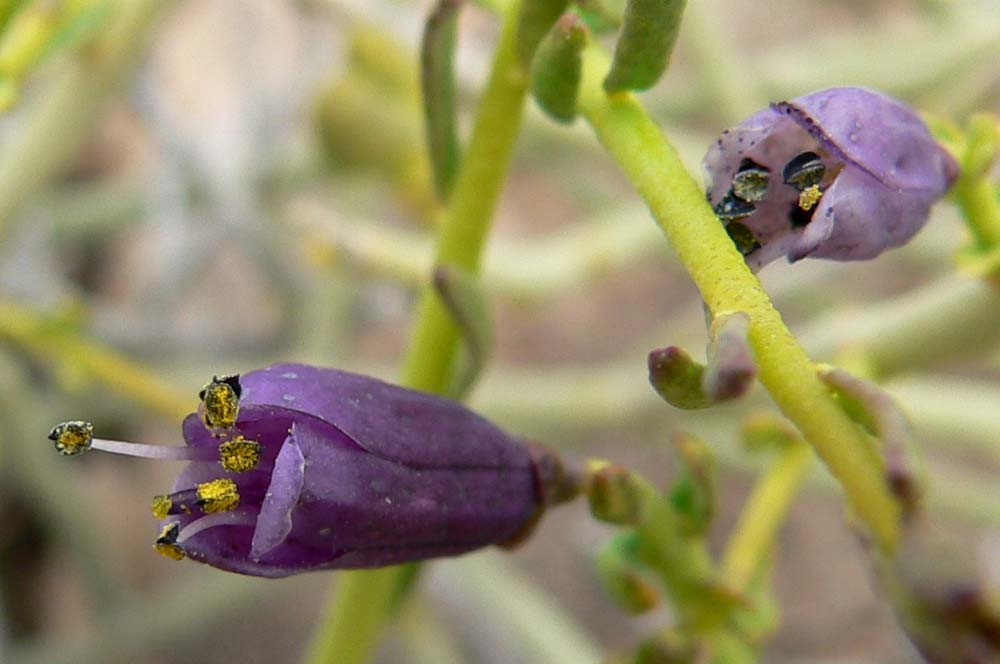
Turpentine-broom, (Thamnosma montana)

- Teclea Delile, synonym of Vepris
- Tetractomia Hook.f.
- Tetradium Lour.
- Thamnosma Torr. & Frém.
- Ticorea Aubl.
- Toddalia Juss., synonym of Zanthoxylum
- Toxosiphon Baill.
- Triphasia Lour.

== V ==
- Vepris Comm. ex A.Juss.

== W ==
- Wenzelia Merr.

== Z ==
- Zanthoxylum L. - toothache tree
- Zieria Sm. (may be included in Boronia)
