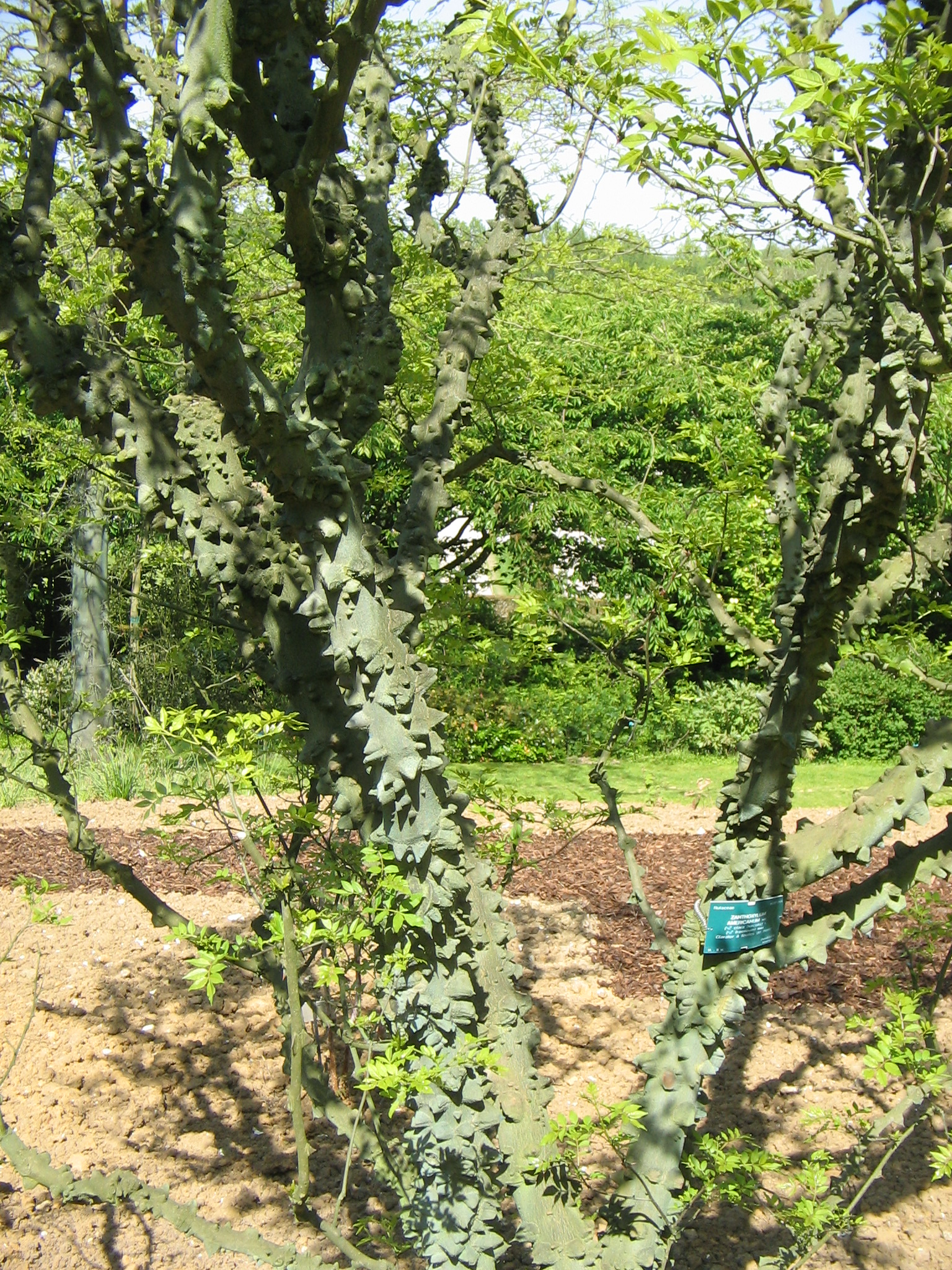
- Zanthoxylum americanum

Scientific classification
- Kingdom: Plantae
- Clade: Tracheophytes
- Clade: Angiosperms
- Clade: Eudicots
- Clade: Rosids
- Order: Sapindales
- Family: Rutaceae
- Subfamily: Zanthoxyloideae; A.Juss. ex Arn.

Genera
- See text.

= Zanthoxyloideae =

Subfamily of plants

Zanthoxyloideae is a subfamily of the family Rutaceae. Its most notable member is probably Sichuan pepper.

== Genera ==
The division of the subfamily into genera varied, as of September 2021. Genera accepted in a 2021 classification of Rutaceae into subfamilies were:

- Acmadenia Bartl. & H.L.Wendl.
- Acradenia Kippist
- Acronychia J.R.Forst. & G.Forst.
- Adenandra Willd.
- Adiscanthus Ducke
- Agathosma Willd.
- Andreadoxa Kallunki
- Angostura Roem. & Schult.
- Apocaulon R.S.Cowan
- Asterolasia F.Muell.
- Balfourodendron Mello ex Oliv.
- Boronia Sm.
- Bosistoa F.Muell. ex Benth.
- Bouchardatia Baill.
- Brombya F.Muell.
- Calodendrum Thunb.
- Casimiroa La Llave
- Choisya Kunth
- Chorilaena Endl.
- Coatesia F.Muell., syn. Geijera Schott
- Coleonema Bartl. & H.L.Wendl.
- Comptonella Baker f.
- Conchocarpus J.C.Mikan
- Correa Andrews
- Crossosperma T.G.Hartley
- Crowea Sm.
- Cyanothamnus Lindl.
- Decagonocarpus Engl.
- Decatropis Hook.f.
- Decazyx Pittier & S.F.Blake
- Desmotes Kallunki
- Dictamnus L.
- Dinosperma T.G.Hartley
- Diosma L.
- Diplolaena R.Br.
- Drummondita Harv.
- Dutailliopsis T.G.Hartley
- Dutaillyea Baill.
- Empleurum Aiton
- Eriostemon Sm.
- Ertela Adans.
- Erythrochiton Nees & Mart.
- Esenbeckia Kunth
- Euchaetis Bartl. & H.L.Wendl.
- Euodia J.R.Forst. & G.Forst.
- Euxylophora Huber
- Fagaropsis Mildbr.
- Flindersia R.Br.
- Galipea Aubl.
- Geijera Schott
- Geleznowia Turcz.
- Halfordia F.Muell.
- Helietta Tul.
- Hortia Vand.
- Ivodea Capuron
- Leionema (F.Muell.) Paul G.Wilson
- Leptothyrsa Hook.f.
- Lubaria Pittier
- Lunasia Blanco
- Maclurodendron T.G.Hartley
- Macrostylis Bartl. & H.L.Wendl.
- Medicosma Hook.f.
- Megastigma Hook.f.
- Melicope J.R.Forst. & G.Forst.
- Metrodorea A.St.-Hil.
- Microcybe Turcz.
- Muiriantha C.A.Gardner
- Myrtopsis Engl.
- Naudinia Planch. & Linden
- Nematolepis Turcz.
- Neobyrnesia J.A.Armstr.
- Neoraputia Emmerich ex Kallunki
- Neoschmidea T.G.Hartley
- Orixa Thunb.
- Peltostigma Walp.
- Pentaceras Hook.f.
- Perryodendron T.G.Hartley
- Phebalium Vent.
- Phellodendron Rupr.
- Philotheca Rudge
- Phyllosma Bolus ex Schltr.
- Picrella Baill.
- Pilocarpus Vahl
- Pitavia Molina
- Pitaviaster T.G.Hartley
- Plethadenia Urb.
- Polyaster Hook.f.
- Ptelea L.
- Raputia Aubl.
- Raputiarana Emmerich
- Rauia Nees & Mart.
- Raulinoa R.S.Cowan
- Ravenia Vell.
- Raveniopsis Gleason
- Rhadinothamnus Paul G.Wilson
- Rutaneblina Steyerm. & Luteyn
- Sarcomelicope Engl.
- Sheilanthera I.Williams
- Sigmatanthus Huber ex Emmerich
- Skimmia Thunb.
- Spiranthera A.St.-Hil.
- Tetractomia Hook.f.
- Tetradium Lour.
- Ticorea Aubl.
- Toxosiphon Baill.
- Vepris Comm. ex A Juss.
- Zanthoxylum L.
- Zieria Sm.

Some further genera placed in the subfamily by the Angiosperm Phylogeny Website include:

- Afraurantium A.Chevalier
- Araliopsis Engl., syn. Vepris Comm. ex A Juss.
- Bouzetia Montrouzier
- Coombea P.Royen, syn. Medicosma Hook.f.
- Dendrosma Pancher & Sebert, syn. Geijera Schott
- Nycticalanthus Ducke, syn. Spiranthera A.St.-Hil.
- Toddalia Juss., syn. Zanthoxylum L.
- Urocarpus J.Drumm. ex Harv., syn. Asterolasia F.Muell.
