= Euchaetis =

Euchaetis may refer to:

- Euchaetis (moth), a genus of insects in the family Oecophoridae
- Euchaetis (plant), a genus of plants in the family Rutaceae
