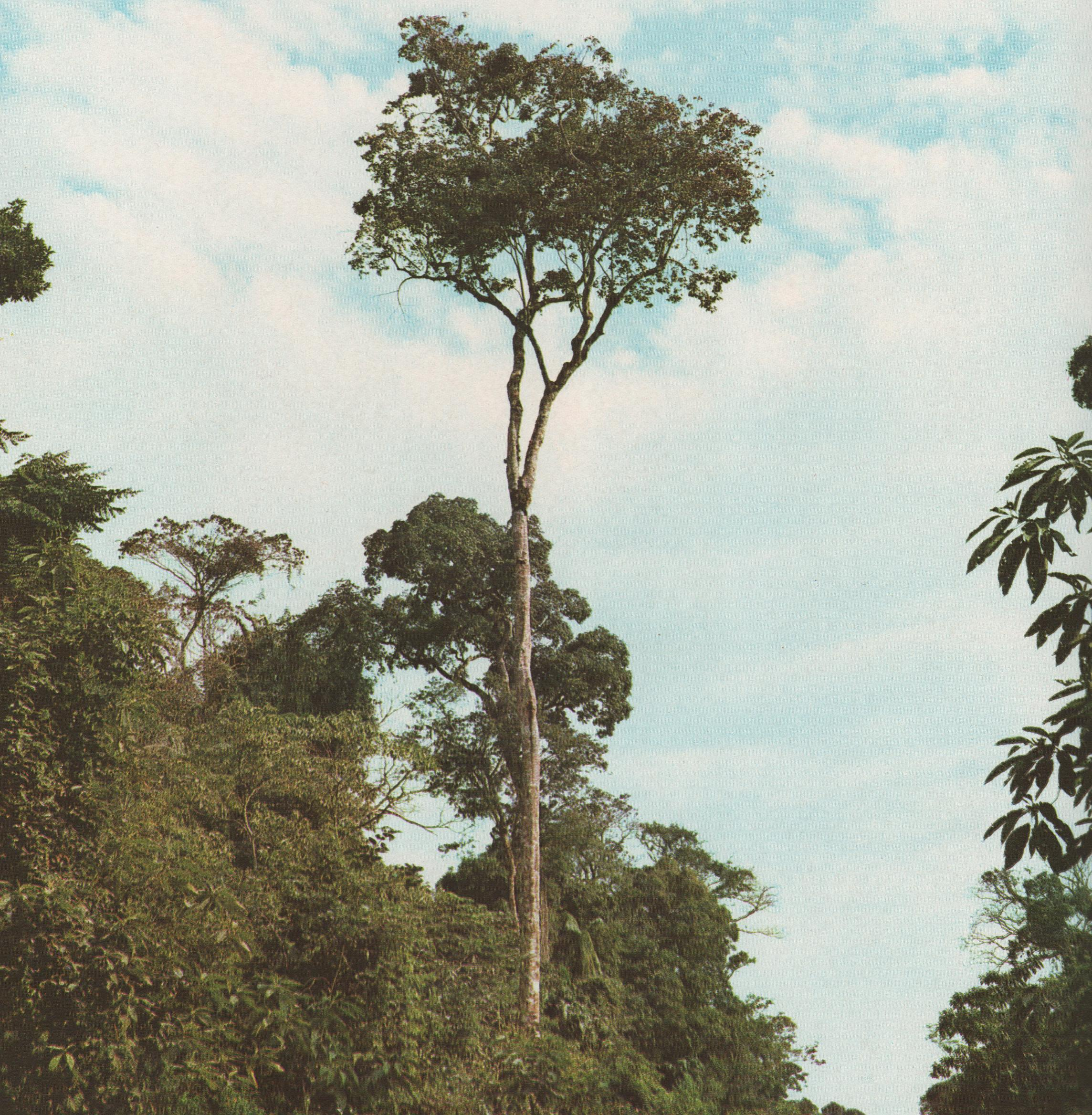

Conservation status
- Endangered (IUCN 2.3)

Scientific classification
- Kingdom: Plantae
- Clade: Tracheophytes
- Clade: Angiosperms
- Clade: Eudicots
- Clade: Rosids
- Order: Sapindales
- Family: Rutaceae
- Genus: Balfourodendron
- Species: B. riedelianum

Binomial name
- Balfourodendron riedelianum (Engl.) (Engl.)

Synonyms
- Esenbeckia riedeliana Engl.

= Balfourodendron riedelianum =

Species of tree

Balfourodendron riedelianum, known as marfim in Portuguese, is a species of flowering tree in the rue family, Rutaceae. It is native to Argentina, Brazil, and Paraguay.
