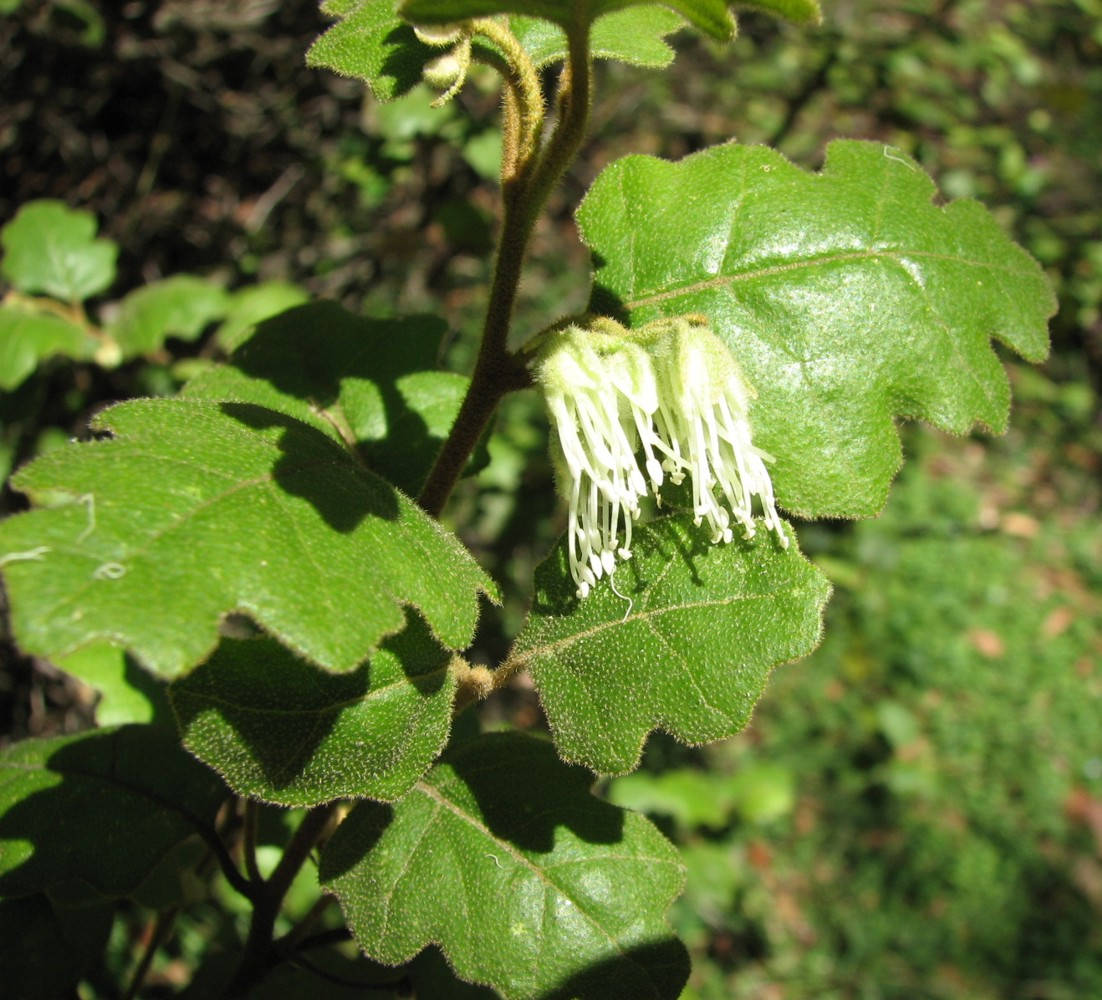
- Chorilaena quercifolia in Karwarra Gardens

Scientific classification
- Kingdom: Plantae
- Clade: Tracheophytes
- Clade: Angiosperms
- Clade: Eudicots
- Clade: Rosids
- Order: Sapindales
- Family: Rutaceae
- Subfamily: Zanthoxyloideae
- Genus: Chorilaena; Endl.
- Species: C. quercifolia

Binomial name
- Chorilaena quercifolia Endl.

Synonyms
- Chorilaena hirsuta Benth.; Eriostemon quercifolius (Endl.) F.Muell.

= Chorilaena =

Karri oak

Genus of flowering plants

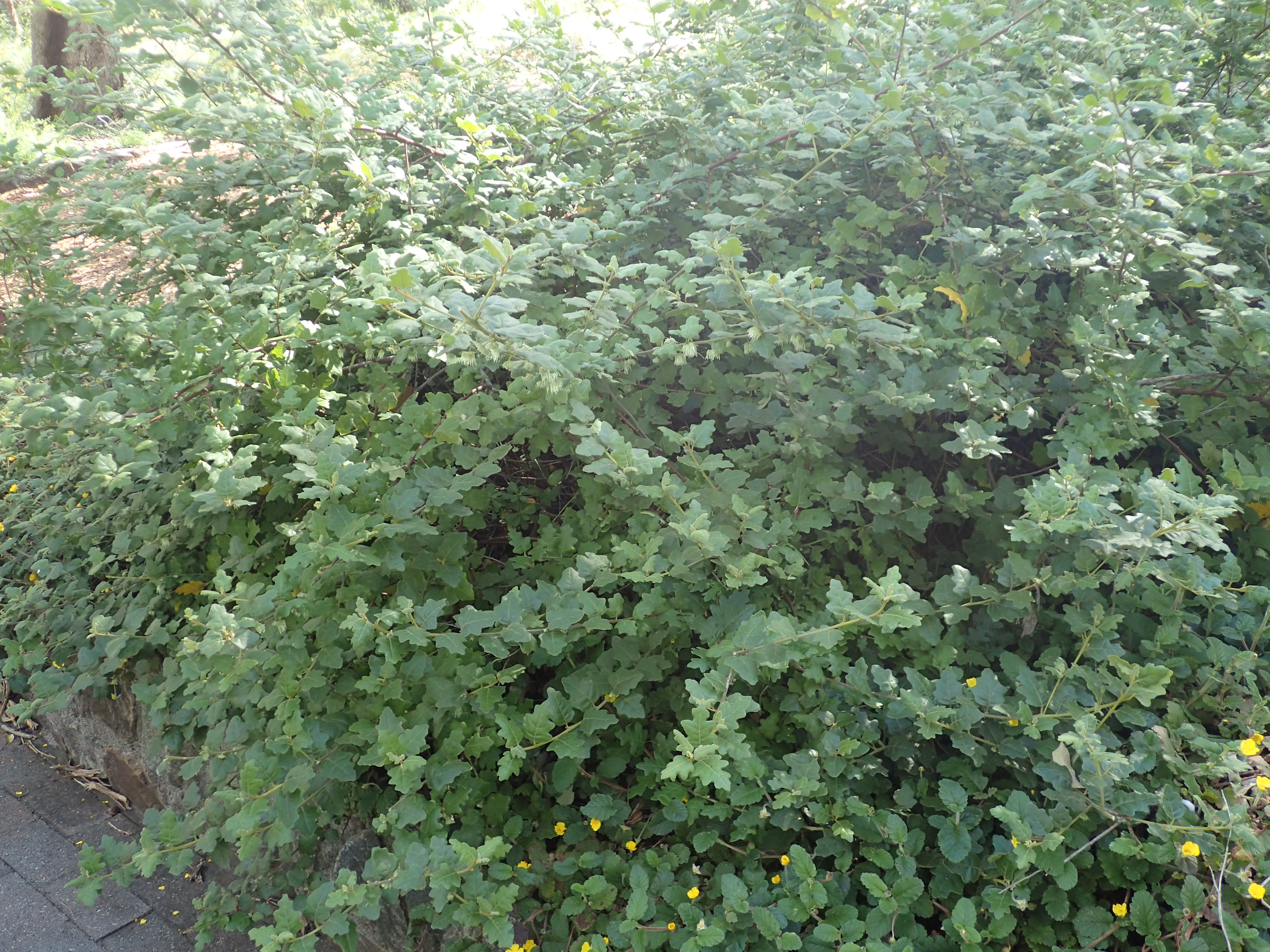
Habit in Kings Park, Perth

Chorilaena quercifolia, commonly known as karri oak or chorilaena, is a species of bushy shrub that is endemic to the karri forests of south-west Western Australia. It is the sole species in the genus Chorilaena. It has papery, broadly egg-shaped leaves with lobed edges and variously-coloured flowers arranged in umbels of five, the sepals and petals hairy on the outside and the stamens protruding beyond the petals.

== Description ==
Chorilaena quercifolia is a bushy shrub that typically grows to a 1–4 m (3 ft 3 in – 13 ft 1 in) high and 1–3 m (3 ft 3 in – 9 ft 10 in) wide. The leaves are papery, broadly egg-shaped, 30–55 mm (1.2–2.2 in) long on a thin petiole about 10 mm (0.39 in) long. The flowers are usually green, sometimes yellow, white red or pink and are arranged in umbels of five on a downturned peduncle about 10 mm (0.39 in) long. The central flower is sessile, the surrounding four flowers on horizontally spreading pedicels about 4 mm (0.16 in) long. At the base of the sepals there are thread-like to spatula-shaped bracts and bracteoles that are about the same length as the flowers. The sepals are joined at the base with narrow triangular lobes about 6 mm (0.24 in) long and covered on the outside with woolly and star-shaped hairs. The petals are oblong to elliptical, 7–8 mm (0.28–0.31 in) long with star-shaped hairs on the outside and the stamens are two to three times as long as the petals. Flowering mainly occurs between October and February.

== Taxonomy ==
Chorilaena quercifolia was first formally described in 1837 by Austrian botanist Stephan Endlicher. The description was published in his book, Enumeratio plantarum quas in Novae Hollandiae ora austro-occidentali ad fluvium Cygnorum et in sinu Regis Georgii collegit Carolus Liber Baro de Hügel, based on plant material collected from King George Sound by Charles von Hügel. The leaves are shaped like those of an oak (genus Quercus), hence the specific epithet quercifolia.

== Distribution and habitat ==
Karri oak grows on rocky coasts and on hillsides within 60 km (37 mi) of the coast between Cape Naturaliste and Bald Island in Western Australia.

== Conservation status ==
This species is listed as "not threatened" by the Government of Western Australia Department of Parks and Wildlife.
