= Adiscanthus =

- Illustration of fruit and flower

Scientific classification
- Kingdom: Plantae
- Clade: Tracheophytes
- Clade: Angiosperms
- Clade: Eudicots
- Clade: Rosids
- Order: Sapindales
- Family: Rutaceae
- Subfamily: Zanthoxyloideae
- Genus: Adiscanthus; Ducke

Genus of flowering plants

Adiscanthus is a genus of flowering plants belonging to the family Rutaceae.

Its native range is northern South America.

Species:

- Adiscanthus fusciflorus Ducke
