= Decatropis =

Scientific classification
- Kingdom: Plantae
- Clade: Tracheophytes
- Clade: Angiosperms
- Clade: Eudicots
- Clade: Rosids
- Order: Sapindales
- Family: Rutaceae
- Subfamily: Zanthoxyloideae
- Genus: Decatropis; Hook.f.

Genus of plants

Decatropis is a genus of flowering plants belonging to the family Rutaceae.

Its native range is Mexico to Central America.

Species:

- Decatropis bicolor (Zucc.) Radlk.
- Decatropis coulteri Hook.f.
- Decatropis paucijuga (Donn.Sm.) Loes.
