= Decagonocarpus =

Scientific classification
- Kingdom: Plantae
- Clade: Tracheophytes
- Clade: Angiosperms
- Clade: Eudicots
- Clade: Rosids
- Order: Sapindales
- Family: Rutaceae
- Subfamily: Zanthoxyloideae
- Genus: Decagonocarpus; Engl.

Genus of flowering plants

Decagonocarpus is a genus of flowering plants belonging to the family Rutaceae.

Its native range is Eastern Colombia to Northwestern Brazil.

Species:

- Decagonocarpus cornutus R.S.Cowan
- Decagonocarpus oppositifolius Engl.
