= Sigmatanthus =

Scientific classification
- Kingdom: Plantae
- Clade: Tracheophytes
- Clade: Angiosperms
- Clade: Eudicots
- Clade: Rosids
- Order: Sapindales
- Family: Rutaceae
- Subfamily: Zanthoxyloideae
- Genus: Sigmatanthus; Huber ex Emmerich
- Species: S. trifoliatus

Binomial name
- Sigmatanthus trifoliatus Huber ex Emmerich

Genus of plants

Sigmatanthus is a monotypic genus of flowering plants belonging to the family Rutaceae. The only species is Sigmatanthus trifoliatus.

The species is found in Northern and Northeastern Brazil.
