= Dutailliopsis =

Conservation status
- Vulnerable (IUCN 3.1)

Scientific classification
- Kingdom: Plantae
- Clade: Tracheophytes
- Clade: Angiosperms
- Clade: Eudicots
- Clade: Rosids
- Order: Sapindales
- Family: Rutaceae
- Subfamily: Zanthoxyloideae
- Genus: Dutailliopsis; T.G.Hartley
- Species: D. gordonii

Binomial name
- Dutailliopsis gordonii T.G.Hartley

Species of plant

Dutailliopsis gordonii is a species of flowering plants in the monotypic genus of Dutailliopsis and belongs to the family Rutaceae.

Its native range is the island of New Caledonia.

The genus name of Dutailliopsis is in honour of Gustave Dutailly (1846–1906), a French botanist, politician and art collector, it was published and described in Adansonia séries 3, Vol.19 on page 210 in 1997. The epithet of gordonii comes from the middle name of the American plant author, Thomas Gordon Hartley.

It is found in dense lowland humid forest on an ultramafic substrate at an altitudinal range 150-200 m above sea level. It is under threat due to habitat degradation by an invasive species (feral pigs).
