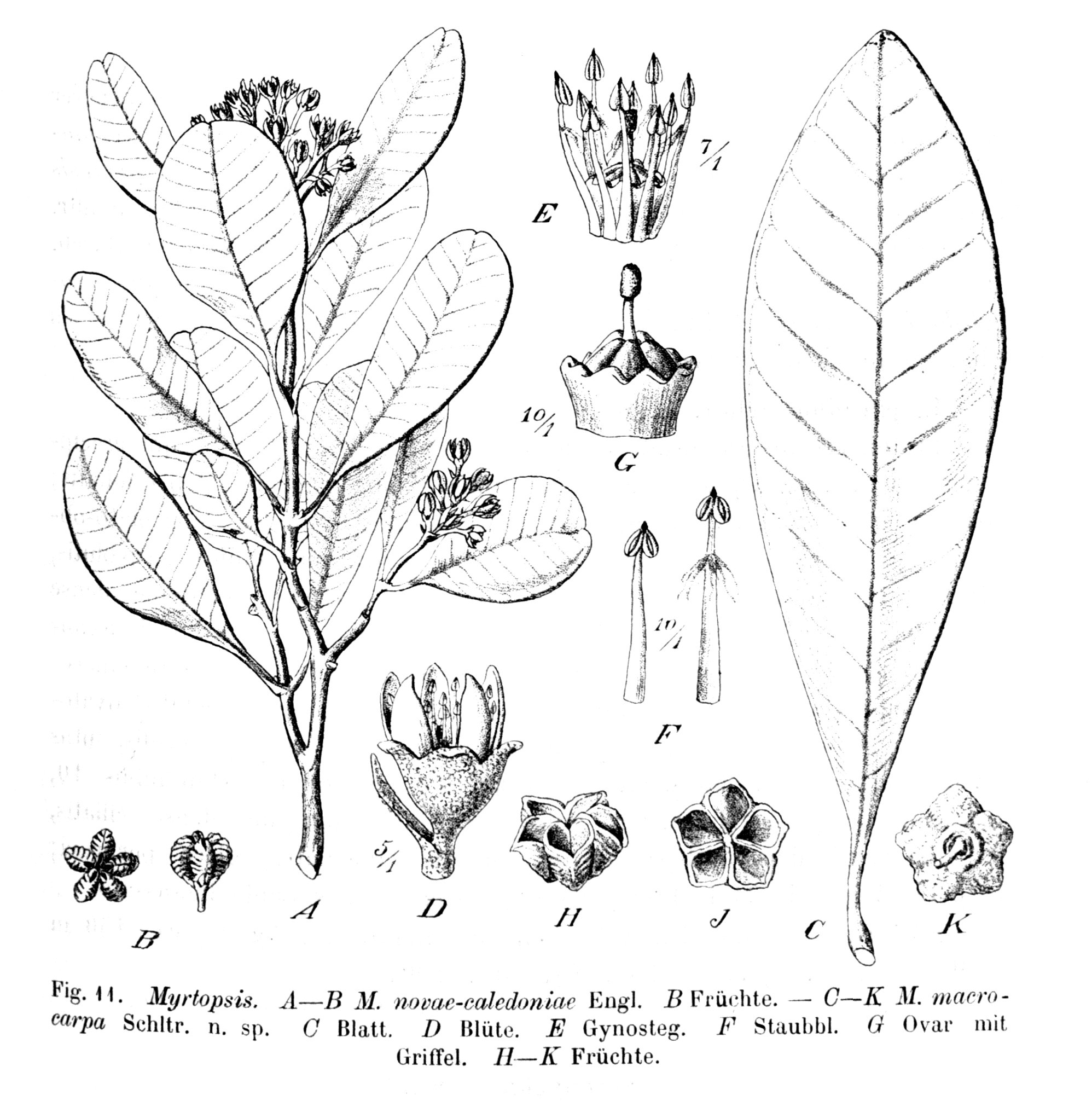

Scientific classification
- Kingdom: Plantae
- Clade: Tracheophytes
- Clade: Angiosperms
- Clade: Eudicots
- Clade: Rosids
- Order: Sapindales
- Family: Rutaceae
- Subfamily: Zanthoxyloideae
- Genus: Myrtopsis; Engl.

= Myrtopsis =

Genus of shrubs

Myrtopsis is a genus of shrubs in the family Rutaceae. The genus is endemic to New Caledonia in the Pacific and contains c. 8 species.

== List of species ==
- Myrtopsis calophylla
- Myrtopsis corymbosa
- Myrtopsis deplanchei
- Myrtopsis macrocarpa
- Myrtopsis myrtoidea
- Myrtopsis novaecaledoniae
- Myrtopsis pomaderridifolia
- Myrtopsis sellingii
