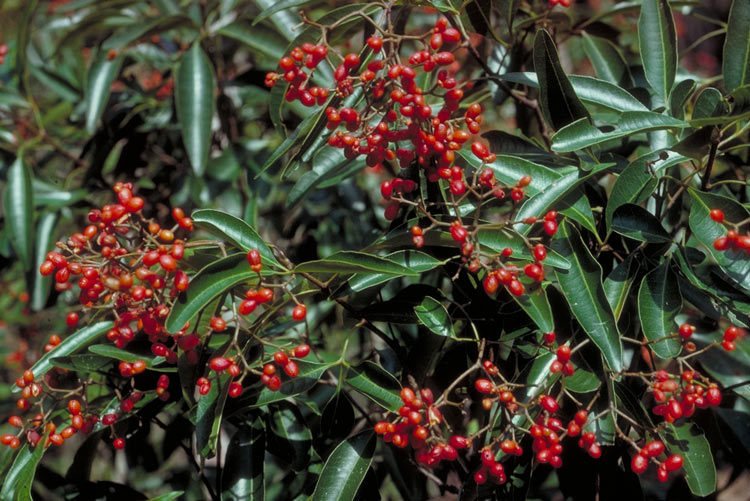

Scientific classification
- Kingdom: Plantae
- Clade: Tracheophytes
- Clade: Angiosperms
- Clade: Eudicots
- Clade: Rosids
- Order: Sapindales
- Family: Rutaceae
- Subfamily: Zanthoxyloideae
- Genus: Dinosperma; T.G.Hartley
- Species: D. erythrococcum

Binomial name
- Dinosperma erythrococcum (F.Muell.) T.G.Hartley

Synonyms
- Dinosperma erythrococca T.G.Hartley orth. var.; Euodia erythrococca F.Muell.; Melicope erythrococca (F.Muell.) Benth.

= Dinosperma =

Tingletongue

Genus of flowering plants

Dinosperma is a genus of plant containing the single species Dinosperma erythrococcum, commonly known as tingletongue, clubwood or nutmeg, and is endemic to north-eastern Australia. It is a tree usually with trifoliate leaves arranged in opposite pairs, the leaflets lance-shaped to oblong, and panicles of small white flowers, later bright orange to red, slightly fleshy follicles containing shiny, bluish black seeds.

== Description ==
Dinosperma erythrococcum is a tree that typically grows to a height of 23 m (75 ft) and is more or less glabrous. It has mostly trifoliate leaves arranged in opposite pairs on a petiole 10–30 mm (0.39–1.18 in) long, the leaflets lance-shaped to oblong, 23–100 mm (0.91–3.94 in) long and 10–30 mm (0.39–1.18 in) wide, the side leaflets on petiolules up to 7 mm (0.28 in) long, the end leaflet on a petiolule 1.5–20 mm (0.059–0.787 in) long. The leaves have distinct but scattered oil dots. The flowers are arranged in panicles 35–90 mm (1.4–3.5 in) long. The sepals are about 1 mm (0.039 in) long, the white petals about 3 mm (0.12 in) long, and there are eight stamens that are about the same length as the petals. Flowering mainly occurs from spring to early summer and the fruit is an elliptical, orange to red, slightly fleshy follicle 6–8.5 mm (0.24–0.33 in) long containing glossy black or bluish black seeds.

== Taxonomy ==
In 1858, Ferdinand von Mueller described Euodia erythrococca and published the description in Fragmenta phytographiae Australiae from specimens collected near Wide Bay and Moreton Bay. In 1997, Thomas Gordon Hartley raised the genus Dinosperma in the journal Adansonia and transferred von Mueller's plant as Dinosperma erythrococcum.

== Distribution and habitat ==
Tingletongue grows in rainforest, often dry rainforest, at altitudes from 60 m (200 ft) to 1,000 m (3,300 ft) and occurs from the Kutini-Payamu National Park in far north Queensland to the headwaters of the Clarence and Richmond Rivers in north-eastern New South Wales.

== Conservation status ==
This tree is listed as of "least concern" under the Queensland Government Nature Conservation Act 1992.
