= Drummondita =

Scientific classification
- Kingdom: Plantae
- Clade: Tracheophytes
- Clade: Angiosperms
- Clade: Eudicots
- Clade: Rosids
- Order: Sapindales
- Family: Rutaceae
- Subfamily: Zanthoxyloideae
- Genus: Drummondita; Harv.

Genus of plants

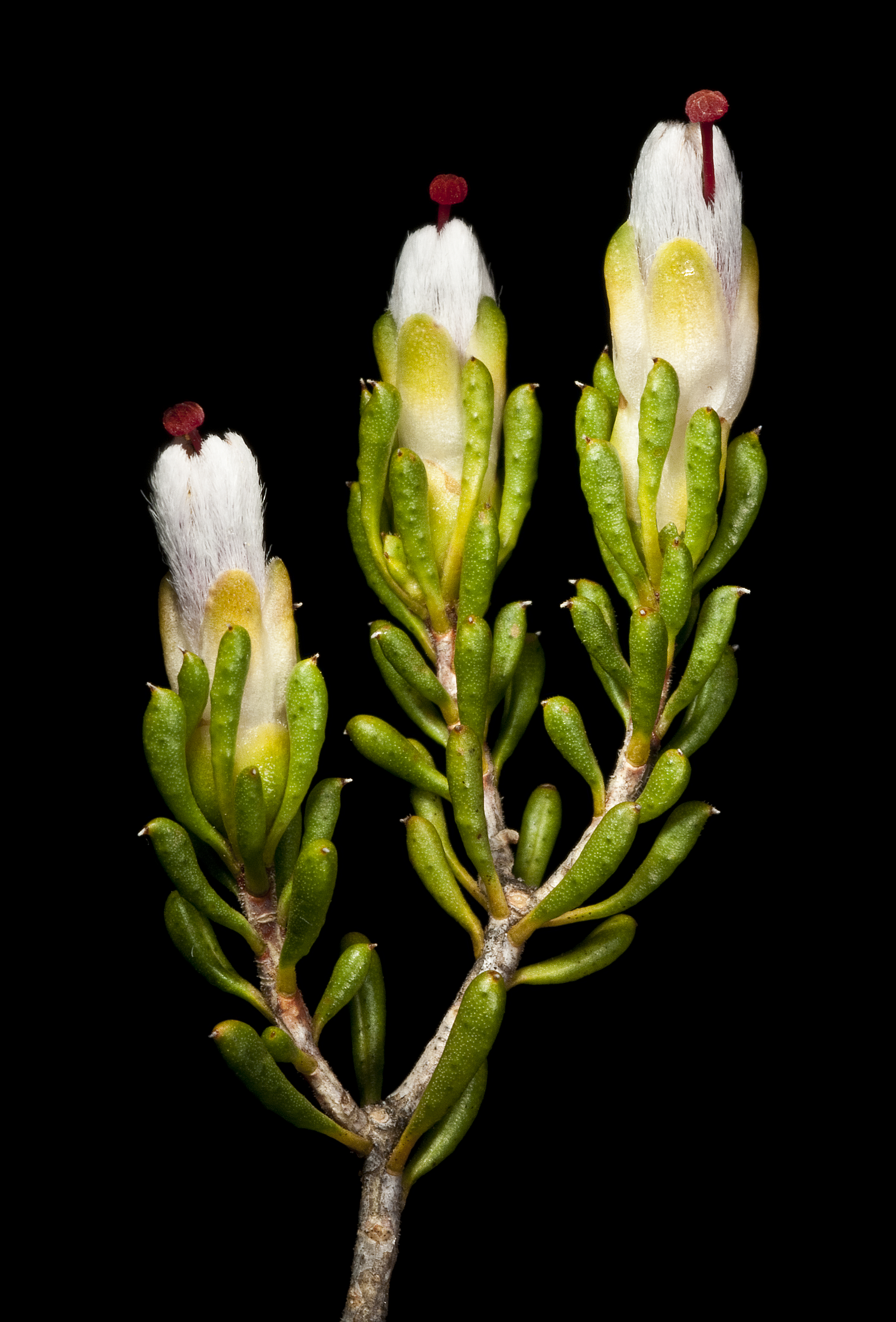
Drummondita hassellii

Drummondita is a genus of flowering plants belonging to the family Rutaceae.

Its native range is Southwestern and Northern Australia.

The genus name of Drummondita is derived from Thomas Drummond (1780–1835) and his brother James Drummond (1787–1863).

Species:

- Drummondita borealis Duretto
- Drummondita calida (F.Muell.) Paul G.Wilson
- Drummondita ericoides Harv.
- Drummondita fulva A.S.Markey & R.A.Meissn.
- Drummondita hassellii (F.Muell.) Paul G.Wilson
- Drummondita longifolia (Paul G.Wilson) Paul G.Wilson
- Drummondita microphylla Paul G.Wilson
- Drummondita miniata (C.A.Gardner) Paul G.Wilson
- Drummondita rubriviridis R.A.Meissn.
- Drummondita wilsonii Mollemans
