= Ertela =

Scientific classification
- Kingdom: Plantae
- Clade: Tracheophytes
- Clade: Angiosperms
- Clade: Eudicots
- Clade: Rosids
- Order: Sapindales
- Family: Rutaceae
- Subfamily: Zanthoxyloideae
- Genus: Ertela; Adans.

Genus of plants

Ertela is a genus of flowering plants belonging to the family Rutaceae.

Its native range is Southwestern Mexico, Southern Tropical America.

Species:

- Ertela bahiensis (Engl.) Kuntze
- Ertela trifolia (L.) Kuntze
