= Polyaster =

Scientific classification
- Kingdom: Plantae
- Clade: Tracheophytes
- Clade: Angiosperms
- Clade: Eudicots
- Clade: Rosids
- Order: Sapindales
- Family: Rutaceae
- Subfamily: Zanthoxyloideae
- Genus: Polyaster; Hook.f.

Genus of flowering plants

Polyaster is a genus of flowering plants belonging to the family Rutaceae.

Its native range is Northern America.

Species:

- Polyaster boronioides Benth. & Hook.f.
