= Dutaillyea =

Scientific classification
- Kingdom: Plantae
- Clade: Tracheophytes
- Clade: Angiosperms
- Clade: Eudicots
- Clade: Rosids
- Order: Sapindales
- Family: Rutaceae
- Subfamily: Zanthoxyloideae
- Genus: Dutaillyea; Baill.

Genus of plants

Dutaillyea is a genus of flowering plants belonging to the family Rutaceae.

Its native range is the island of New Caledonia.

The genus name of Dutaillyea is in honour of Gustave Dutailly (1846–1906), a French botanist, politician and art collector, it was published and described in Adansonia Vol.10 on page 327 in 1872.

Known species:

- Dutaillyea amosensis (Guillaumin) T.G.Hartley
- Dutaillyea comptonii Baker f.
- Dutaillyea trifoliolata Baill.
