= Toxosiphon =

Scientific classification
- Kingdom: Plantae
- Clade: Tracheophytes
- Clade: Angiosperms
- Clade: Eudicots
- Clade: Rosids
- Order: Sapindales
- Family: Rutaceae
- Subfamily: Zanthoxyloideae
- Genus: Toxosiphon; Baill.

Genus of flowering plants

Toxosiphon is a genus of flowering plants belonging to the family Rutaceae.

Its native range is South America and North America.

Species:

- Toxosiphon carinatus (Little) Kallunki
- Toxosiphon lindenii (Baill.) Baill.
