= Leptothyrsa =

Scientific classification
- Kingdom: Plantae
- Clade: Tracheophytes
- Clade: Angiosperms
- Clade: Eudicots
- Clade: Rosids
- Order: Sapindales
- Family: Rutaceae
- Subfamily: Zanthoxyloideae
- Genus: Leptothyrsa; Hook.f.

Genus of plants

Leptothyrsa is a genus of flowering plants belonging to the family Rutaceae.

Its native range is Southern Tropical America.

Species:

- Leptothyrsa sprucei Benth. & Hook.f.
