= Metrodorea =

Scientific classification
- Kingdom: Plantae
- Clade: Tracheophytes
- Clade: Angiosperms
- Clade: Eudicots
- Clade: Rosids
- Order: Sapindales
- Family: Rutaceae
- Subfamily: Zanthoxyloideae
- Genus: Metrodorea; A.St.-Hil.

Genus of flowering plant

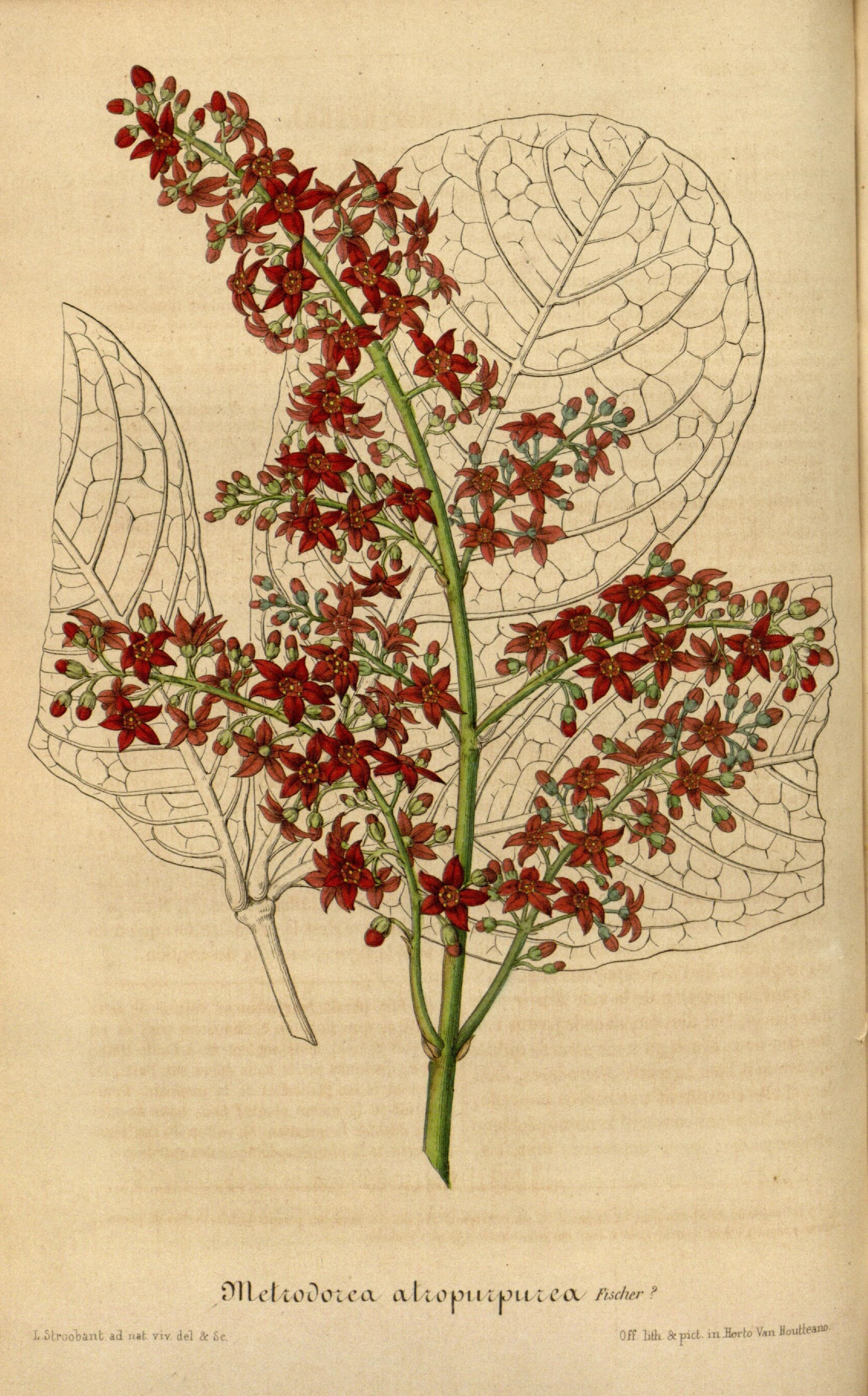

Metrodorea is a genus of flowering plants belonging to the family Rutaceae.

It is native to Peru, Bolivia and Brazil.

The genus name of Metrodorea is in honour of Metrodorus (c. 1st century BC), student of a healer named Sabinus. It was first described and published in Fl. Bras. Merid. Vol.1 on page 81 in 1825.

== Known species ==
According to Kew:

- Metrodorea concinna Pirani & P.Dias
- Metrodorea flavida K.Krause
- Metrodorea maracasana Kaastra
- Metrodorea mollis Taub.
- Metrodorea nigra A.St.-Hil.
- Metrodorea stipularis Mart.
