= Neoraputia =

Scientific classification
- Kingdom: Plantae
- Clade: Tracheophytes
- Clade: Angiosperms
- Clade: Eudicots
- Clade: Rosids
- Order: Sapindales
- Family: Rutaceae
- Subfamily: Zanthoxyloideae
- Genus: Neoraputia; Emmerich ex Kallunki

Genus of flowering plants

Neoraputia is a genus of flowering plants belonging to the family Rutaceae.

Its native range is Southern Tropical America.

Species:

- Neoraputia alba (Nees & Mart.) Emmerich ex Kallunki
- Neoraputia calliantha Kallunki
- Neoraputia magnifica (Engl.) Emmerich ex Kallunki
- Neoraputia micrantha Kallunki
- Neoraputia paraensis (Ducke) Emmerich ex Kallunki
- Neoraputia trifoliata (Engl.) Emmerich ex Kallunki
