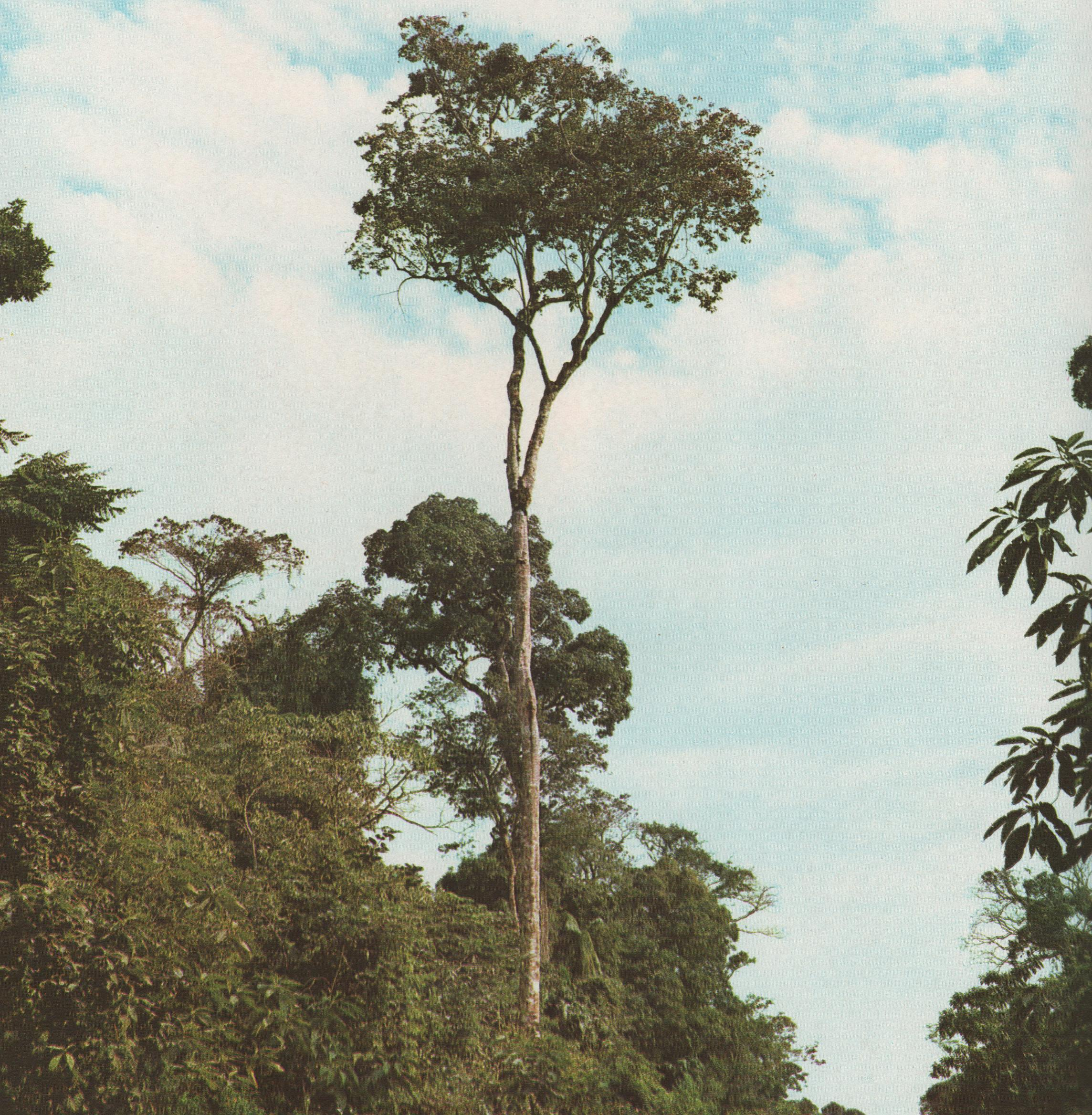
- Balfourodendron riedelianum

Scientific classification
- Kingdom: Plantae
- Clade: Tracheophytes
- Clade: Angiosperms
- Clade: Eudicots
- Clade: Rosids
- Order: Sapindales
- Family: Rutaceae
- Subfamily: Zanthoxyloideae
- Genus: Balfourodendron; Corr.Méllo ex Oliv.

Type species
- Balfourodendron eburneum

= Balfourodendron =

Genus of flowering plants

Balfourodendron is a genus of plant in family Rutaceae. It contains the following species:

- Balfourodendron eburneum
- Balfourodendron molle
- Balfourodendron riedelianum, Engl.
