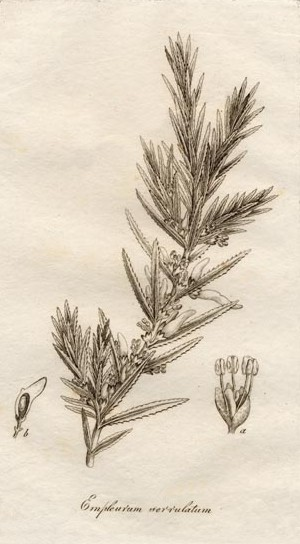
- Empleurum serrulatum

Scientific classification
- Kingdom: Plantae
- Clade: Tracheophytes
- Clade: Angiosperms
- Clade: Eudicots
- Clade: Rosids
- Order: Sapindales
- Family: Rutaceae
- Subfamily: Zanthoxyloideae
- Genus: Empleurum; Aiton

= Empleurum =

Genus of plants

Empleurum is a genus of flowering plants belonging to the family Rutaceae.

Its native range is South African Republic.

Species:

- Empleurum fragrans Glover
- Empleurum unicapsularis (L.f.) Skeels
