= Comptonella =

Scientific classification
- Kingdom: Plantae
- Clade: Tracheophytes
- Clade: Angiosperms
- Clade: Eudicots
- Clade: Rosids
- Order: Sapindales
- Family: Rutaceae
- Subfamily: Zanthoxyloideae
- Genus: Comptonella; Baker f.

Genus of flowering plants

Comptonella is a plant genus endemic to New Caledonia in the family Rutaceae (subfamily Rutoideae). Molecular phylogenetic analyses suggest that this genus is nested in Melicope.

== Species ==
As of 2022, Kew's Plants of the World Online accepts eight species in the genus Comptonella:

- Comptonella baudouinii (Baill.) T.G.Hartley
- Comptonella drupacea (Labill.) Guillaumin
- Comptonella fruticosa T.G.Hartley
- Comptonella glabra T.G.Hartley
- Comptonella lactea (Baker f.) T.G.Hartley
- Comptonella microcarpa (G.Perkins) T.G.Hartley
- Comptonella oreophila (Guillaumin) T.G.Hartley
- Comptonella sessilifoliola (Guillaumin) T.G.Hartley
