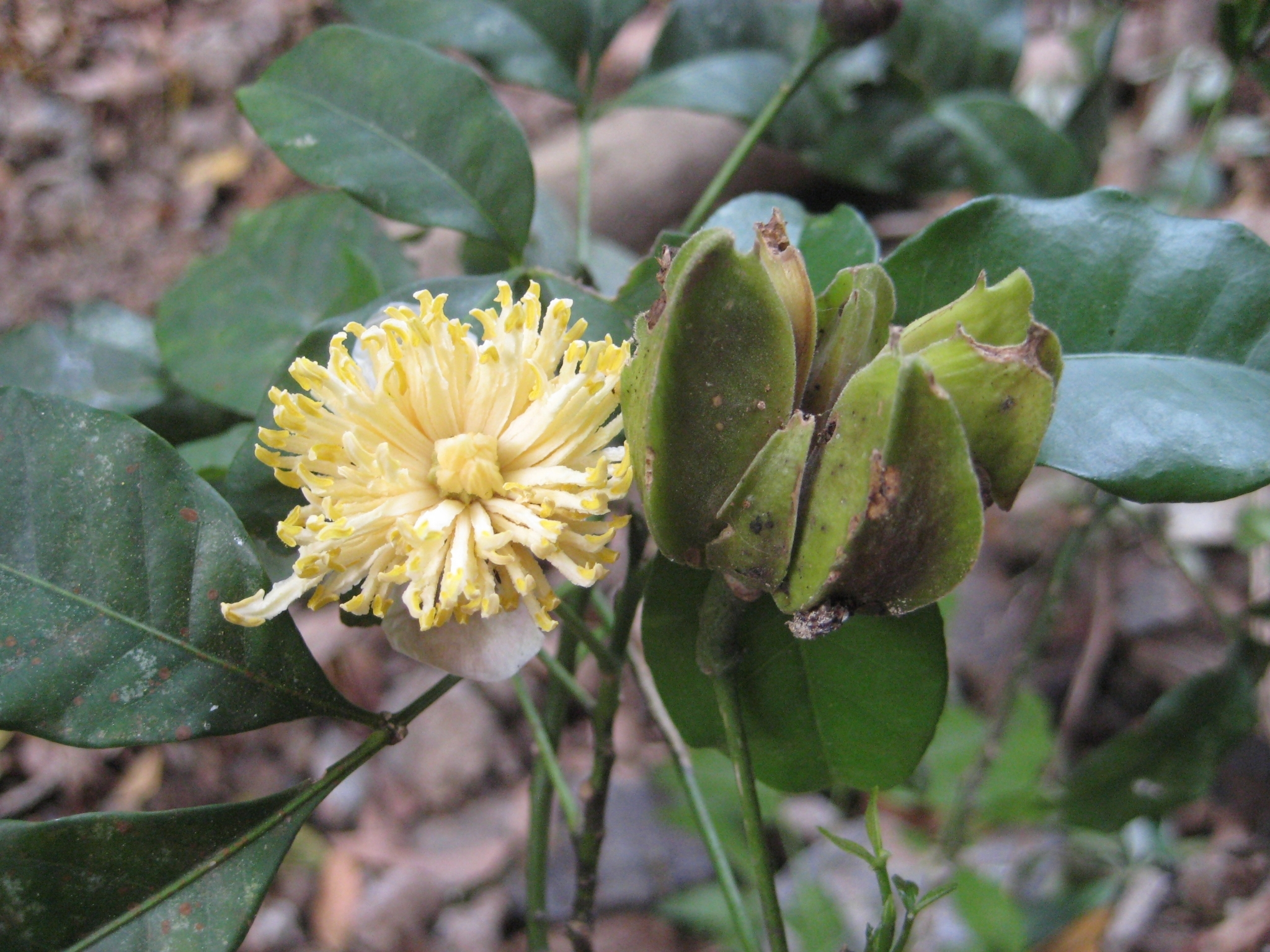
- Peltostigma pteleoides

Scientific classification
- Kingdom: Plantae
- Clade: Tracheophytes
- Clade: Angiosperms
- Clade: Eudicots
- Clade: Rosids
- Order: Sapindales
- Family: Rutaceae
- Subfamily: Zanthoxyloideae
- Genus: Peltostigma; Walp.

Synonyms
- Pachystigma Hook.

= Peltostigma =

Genus of plants

Peltostigma is a genus of flowering plants belonging to the family Rutaceae.

Its native range is Mexico to Peru, Jamaica.

Species:

- Peltostigma guatemalense (Standl. & Steyerm.) Gereau
- Peltostigma pteleoides (Hook.) Walp.
