= Naudinia =

Scientific classification
- Kingdom: Plantae
- Clade: Tracheophytes
- Clade: Angiosperms
- Clade: Eudicots
- Clade: Rosids
- Order: Sapindales
- Family: Rutaceae
- Subfamily: Zanthoxyloideae
- Genus: Naudinia; Planch. & Linden

Species of flowering plants

Naudinia is a monotypic genus of flowering plants belonging to the family Rutaceae. It only contains one known species, Naudinia amabilis Planch. & Linden It is native to Colombia. The genus name of Naudinia is in honour of Charles Victor Naudin (1815–1899), a French naturalist and botanist. The Latin specific epithet of amabilis means lovely. Both genus and species were first described and published in Ann. Sci. Nat., Bot., séries 3, Vol.19 on page 79 in 1853.
