= Raputiarana =

Scientific classification
- Kingdom: Plantae
- Clade: Tracheophytes
- Clade: Angiosperms
- Clade: Eudicots
- Clade: Rosids
- Order: Sapindales
- Family: Rutaceae
- Subfamily: Zanthoxyloideae
- Genus: Raputiarana; Emmerich

Genus of plants

Raputiarana is a genus of flowering plants belonging to the family Rutaceae.

Its native range is Costa Rica to Southern Tropical America.

Species:

- Raputiarana heptaphylla (Pittier) Kallunki
- Raputiarana subsigmoidea (Ducke) Emmerich
