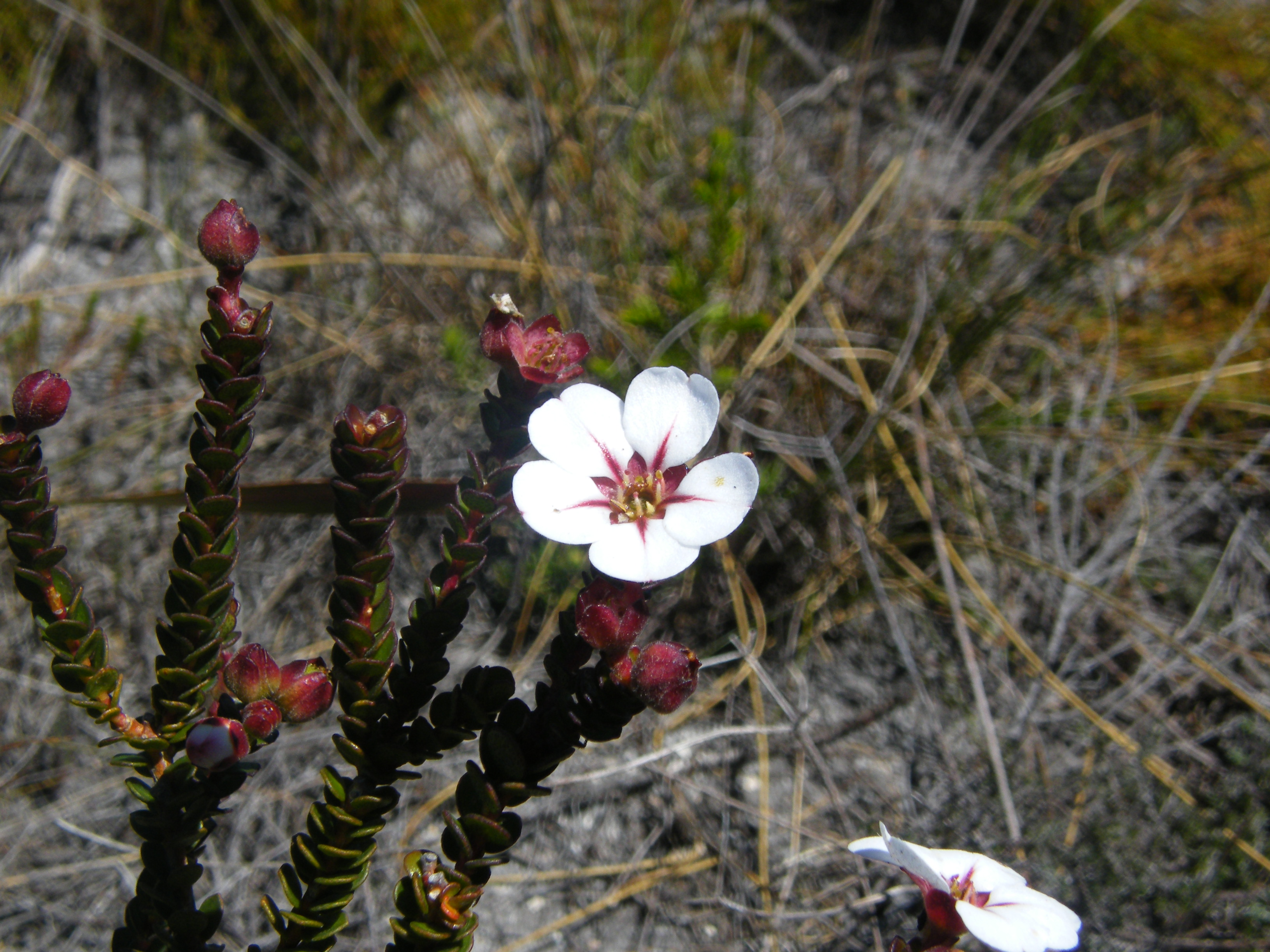
- Adenandra villosa

Scientific classification
- Kingdom: Plantae
- Clade: Embryophytes
- Clade: Tracheophytes
- Clade: Spermatophytes
- Clade: Angiosperms
- Clade: Eudicots
- Clade: Rosids
- Order: Sapindales
- Family: Rutaceae
- Subfamily: Zanthoxyloideae
- Genus: Adenandra; Willd.

Species
- See text.

= Adenandra =

Genus of flowering plants

Adenandra is a genus of evergreen shrubs of the family Rutaceae, commonly known as buchu (plural buchus). The genus is native to South Africa. The plants are related to the citrus family, and have oil glands in the leaves which give off a distinctive aroma. The name Adenandra derives from Greek aden, a gland; ander, a man. The leaves are small and almost scale-like, being sessile or subsessile (stalkless of almost stalkless). The conspicuous flowers have five petals, and are pink or white. Adenandra are cultivated by gardeners for their ornamental and aromatic value.

== Species ==
There are around 18 Adenandra species, including:

- Adenandra acuta: pointy Chinaflower
- Adenandra brachyphylla: shortleaf Chinaflower
- Adenandra coriacea
- Adenandra dahlgrenii: Aynsberg Chinaflower
- Adenandra fragrans: smelly Chinaflower
- Adenandra gracilis
- Adenandra gummifera: gummy Chinaflower
- Adenandra lasiantha
- Adenandra marginata: loose Chinaflower
- Adenandra multiflora: Kogelberg Chinaflower
- Adenandra mundiifolia: resin Chinaflower
- Adenandra obtusata: glutinous Chinaflower
- Adenandra odoratissima
- Adenandra rotundifolia: roundleaf Chinaflower
- Adenandra schlechteri
- Adenandra uniflora: Chinaflower
- Adenandra villosa: hairy Chinaflower
- Adenandra viscida: sticky Chinaflower
