= Plethadenia =

Scientific classification
- Kingdom: Plantae
- Clade: Tracheophytes
- Clade: Angiosperms
- Clade: Eudicots
- Clade: Rosids
- Order: Sapindales
- Family: Rutaceae
- Subfamily: Zanthoxyloideae
- Genus: Plethadenia; Urb.

Genus of plants

Plethadenia is a genus of flowering plants belonging to the family Rutaceae.

Its native range is Cuba to Hispaniola.

Species:

- Plethadenia cubensis Urb.
- Plethadenia granulata (Krug & Urb.) Urb.
