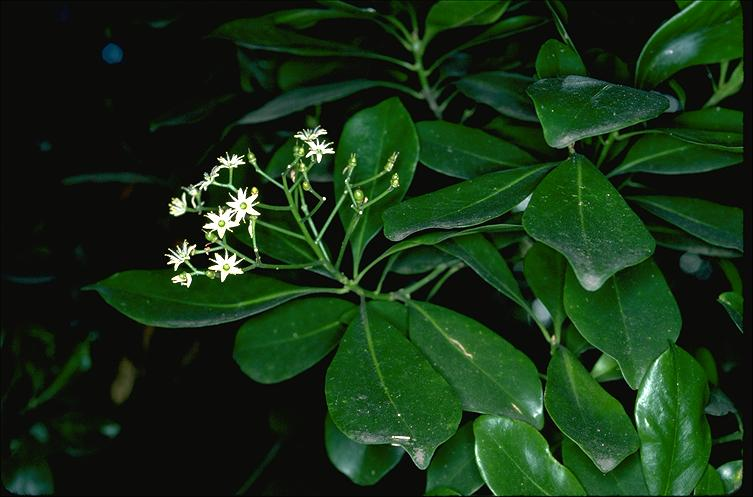
- In Royal Botanic Gardens Victoria
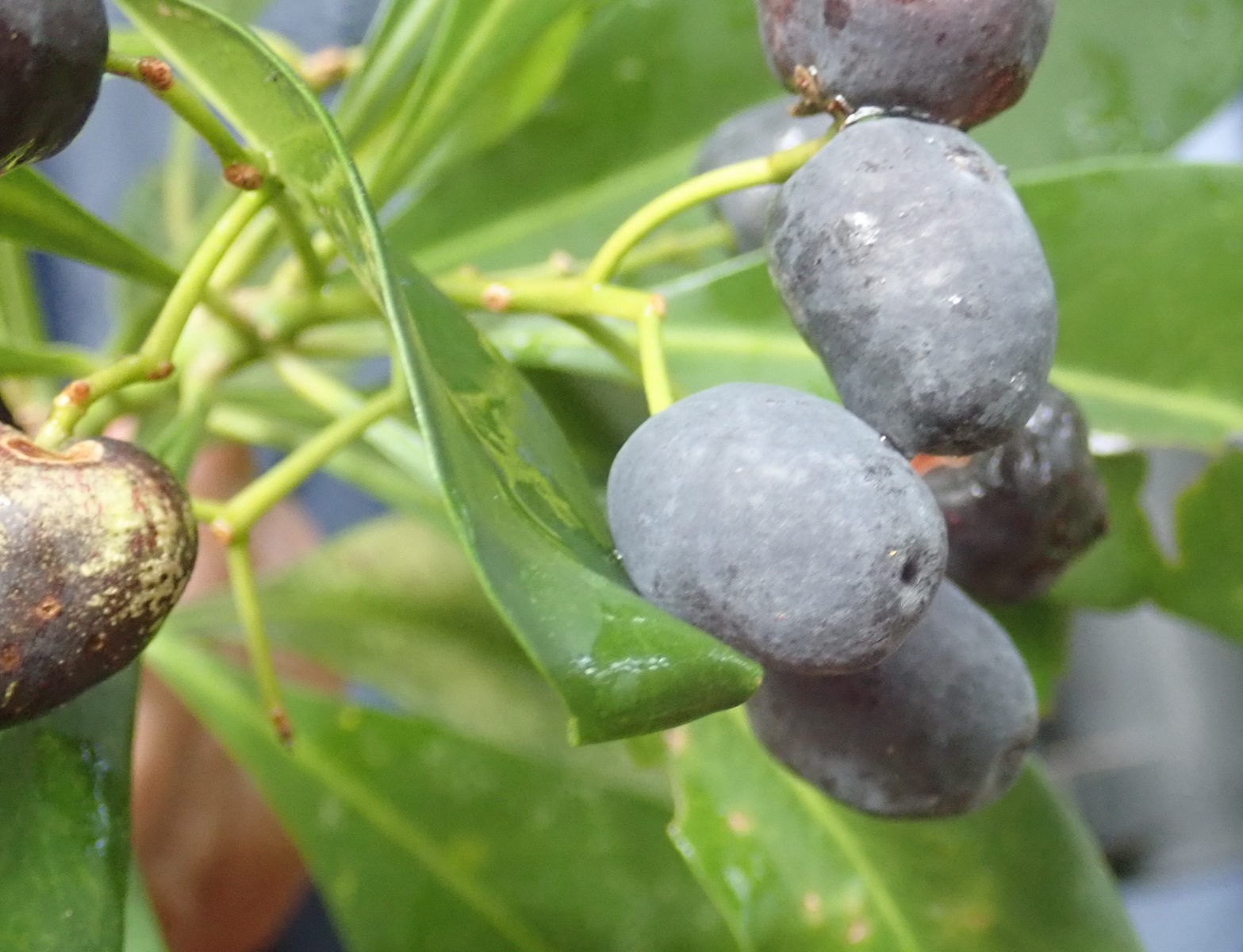
- Fruit at Cooloola, Queensland

Scientific classification
- Kingdom: Plantae
- Clade: Embryophytes
- Clade: Tracheophytes
- Clade: Angiosperms
- Clade: Eudicots
- Clade: Rosids
- Order: Sapindales
- Family: Rutaceae
- Subfamily: Zanthoxyloideae
- Genus: Halfordia; F.Muell.
- Species: H. kendack

Binomial name
- Halfordia kendack (Montrouz.) Guillaumin

Synonyms
- Eriostemon kendack Montrouz.; Eriostemon leichhardtii F.Muell.; Halfordia drupifera F.Muell. nom. illeg.; Halfordia leichardtii Guillaumin orth. var.; Halfordia leichhardtii (F.Muell.) Baill. ex Guillaumin; Halfordia scleroxyla F.Muell.

= Halfordia =

Kerosenewood

Genus of trees

Halfordia is a genus of plants in the family Rutaceae containing the single species Halfordia kendack, commonly known as kerosenewood, southern ghittoe or saffronheart. It is a rainforest plant that is native to eastern Australia, New Guinea and New Caledonia. It is a shrub or tree with elliptical to egg-shaped leaves with the narrower end towards the base, panicles of white, greenish white or yellowish flowers and purple to bluish black, spherical to oval fruit.

== Description ==
Halfordia kendack is a shrub or tree that typically grows to a height of 25–30 m (82–98 ft), the trunk with a diameter of 75 cm (30 in) and often flanged at the base. It has grey or pale yellowish-brown bark with corky pustules and is often rough and wrinkled. The smaller branches are smooth, green and about 13 mm (0.51 in) thick. The leaves are arranged in opposite pairs, elliptical to egg-shaped or lance-shaped with the narrower end towards the base, 50–180 mm (2.0–7.1 in) long and 10–50 mm (0.39–1.97 in) wide and more or less sessile or on a petiole up to 20 mm (0.79 in) long. The leaf tapers to the base and has a rounded or tapered tip and new leaves have a noticeable aromatic scent resembling eau de cologne. There are many conspicuous, closely spaced oil dots.

The flowers are arranged in panicles 30–80 mm (1.2–3.1 in) long, each flower about 11 mm (0.43 in) in diameter on a pedicel 2–3 mm (0.079–0.118 in) long. The sepals are 0.5–1 mm (0.020–0.039 in) long and the petals white, greenish white or yellowish and 4–6 mm (0.16–0.24 in) long with short, soft hairs pressed against the back. Flowering occurs from January to May and the fruit is a purple to bluish black, spherical to oval drupe 8–12 mm (0.31–0.47 in) long that is present in most months.

== Taxonomy ==
The genus Halfordia was first formally described in 1865 by Ferdinand von Mueller in Fragmenta phytographiae Australiae and the first species he described was Halfordia drupifera, now considered a nomen illegitimum.

In 1860, Xavier Montrouzier described Eriostemon kendack in Mémoires de l'Académie Royale des Sciences, Belles-Lettres et Arts de Lyon, and in 1911, André Guillaumin changed the name to Halfordia kendack in Notulae Systematicae.

Halfordia is named after George Britton Halford and "kendack" is an indigenous name for this tree in New Caledonia.

== Distribution and habitat ==
Kerosenewood grows in monsoon woodland and rainforest in coastal and inland areas from sea level to an altitude of 1,260 m (4,130 ft). It is found in New Caledonia, New Guinea and eastern Australia. In Australia it occurs from the Torres Strait Islands to the Cape York Peninsula in Queensland, south to Iluka in New South Wales, including on the Mcpherson and Tweed Ranges.

== Ecology ==
The hard seed is surrounded by pulp, which is eaten by a variety of birds, such as the green catbird, topknot pigeon and wompoo fruit dove. Germination from seeds can be difficult, often erratic.

== Uses ==
Before the development of fibreglass and carbon fibre, the timber of this species was used in the manufacture of fishing rods. The oily, flexible timber is hard, weighing 1100 kg per cubic metre. This plant is gaining popularity in horticulture. The wood is highly flammable, and chips of wood may be used to start a fire, even when wet, hence one of the common names, "kerosene wood".
