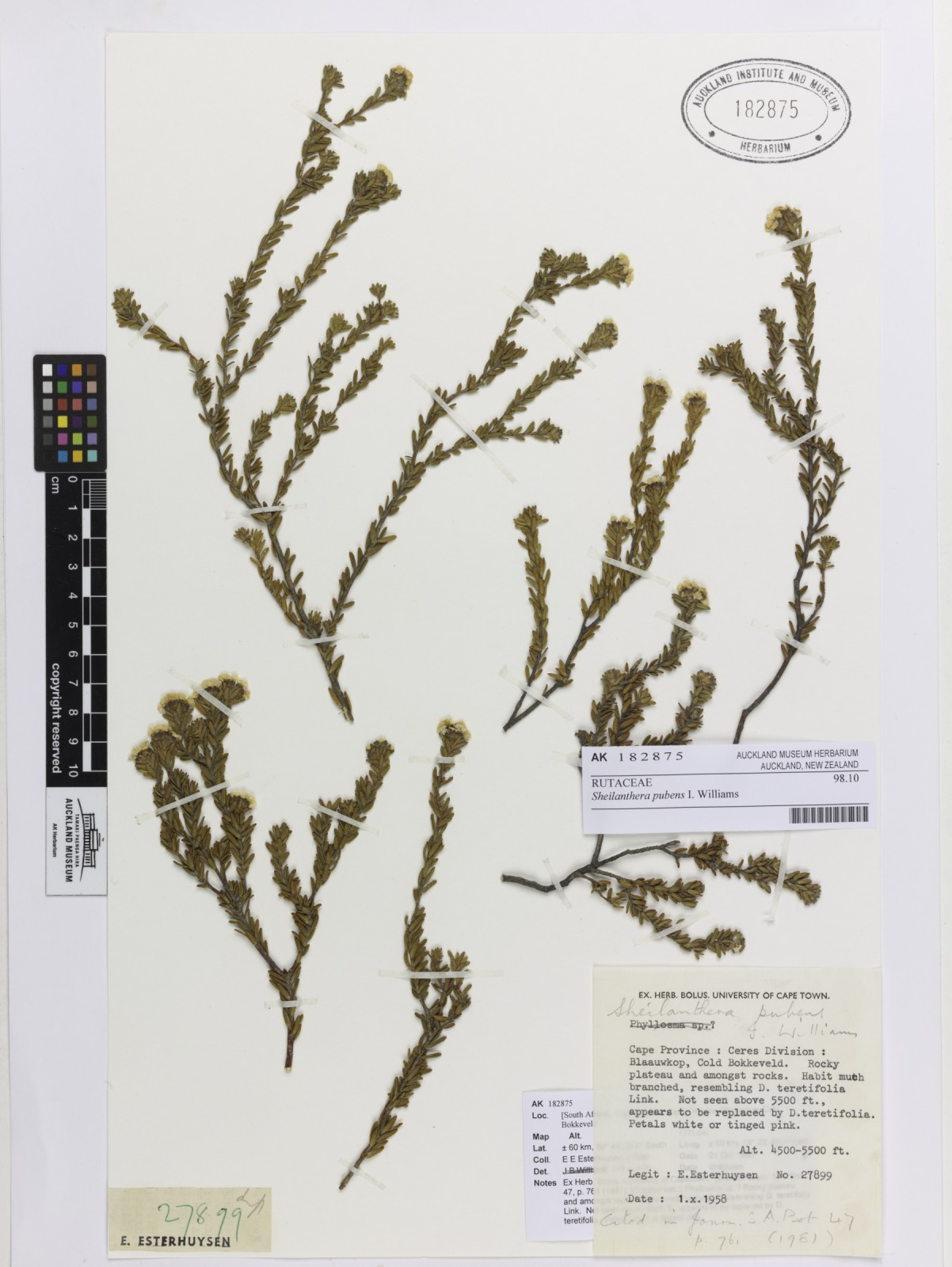
- A herbarium collection of Sheilanthera pubens from Auckland Museum

Scientific classification
- Kingdom: Plantae
- Clade: Tracheophytes
- Clade: Angiosperms
- Clade: Eudicots
- Clade: Rosids
- Order: Sapindales
- Family: Rutaceae
- Subfamily: Zanthoxyloideae
- Genus: Sheilanthera; I.Williams
- Species: S. pubens

Binomial name
- Sheilanthera pubens I.Williams

= Sheilanthera =

Species of flowering plant

Sheilanthera is a monotypic genus of flowering plants belonging to the family Rutaceae. The only known species is Sheilanthera pubens.

It is native to the Cape Provinces of South Africa.

The genus name of Sheilanthera is in honour of Sheila Williams, wife and colleague of Ion James Muirhead Williams (1912–2001), a South African botanist and author of the genus. The Latin specific epithet of pubens means fuzzy or pubescent, derived from pubesco. It was first described and published in J. S. African Bot. Vol.47 on page 761 in 1981.
