= Brombya =

Scientific classification
- Kingdom: Plantae
- Clade: Tracheophytes
- Clade: Angiosperms
- Clade: Eudicots
- Clade: Rosids
- Order: Sapindales
- Family: Rutaceae
- Subfamily: Zanthoxyloideae
- Genus: Brombya; F.Muell.

Genus of flowering plants

Brombya is a genus of flowering plants belonging to the family Rutaceae.

Its native range is Queensland.

Species:

- Brombya platynema F.Muell.
- Brombya smithii T.G.Hartley
