= Picrella =

Scientific classification
- Kingdom: Plantae
- Clade: Tracheophytes
- Clade: Angiosperms
- Clade: Eudicots
- Clade: Rosids
- Order: Sapindales
- Family: Rutaceae
- Subfamily: Zanthoxyloideae
- Genus: Picrella; Baill.

Genus of plants

Picrella is a genus of flowering plants belonging to the family Rutaceae.

Its native range is New Caledonia.

Species:

- Picrella glandulosa T.G.Hartley
- Picrella ignambiensis (Guillaumin) T.G.Hartley & Mabb.
- Picrella trifoliata Baill.
