= Neobyrnesia =

Scientific classification
- Kingdom: Plantae
- Clade: Tracheophytes
- Clade: Angiosperms
- Clade: Eudicots
- Clade: Rosids
- Order: Sapindales
- Family: Rutaceae
- Subfamily: Zanthoxyloideae
- Genus: Neobyrnesia; J.A.Armstr.

Genus of plants

Neobyrnesia is a genus of flowering plants belonging to the family Rutaceae.

Its native range is Northern Australia.

== Species ==
Species:

- Neobyrnesia suberosa J.A.Armstr.
