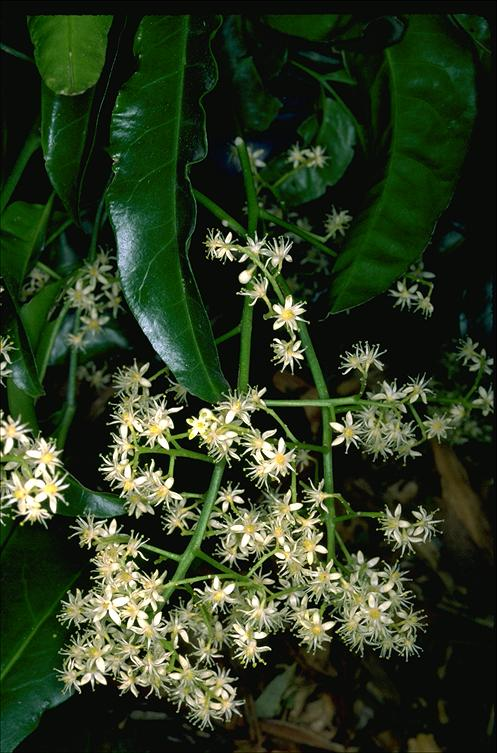

Scientific classification
- Kingdom: Plantae
- Clade: Tracheophytes
- Clade: Angiosperms
- Clade: Eudicots
- Clade: Rosids
- Order: Sapindales
- Family: Rutaceae
- Subfamily: Zanthoxyloideae
- Genus: Pentaceras; Hook.f.
- Species: P. australe

Binomial name
- Pentaceras australe (F.Muell.) Benth.

Synonyms
- Ailanthus punctata F.Muell.; Cookia australis F.Muell.; Pentaceras australis Benth. orth. var.

= Pentaceras =

Bastard crow's ash

Genus of trees

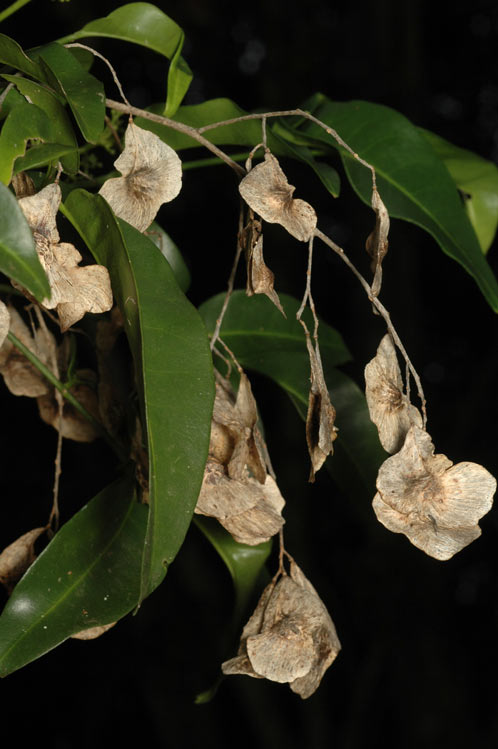
Winged seeds

Pentaceras is a monotypic genus (i.e. a genus that contains just one species) of plants in the citrus family Rutaceae. The sole included species is Pentaceras australe, commonly known as bastard crow's ash, penta ash or black teak. It is a medium-sized rainforest tree endemic to eastern Australia, first described in 1862.

== Description ==
Pentaceras australe is a tree that typically grows to a height of 27 m (89 ft) with a dbh of 45 cm (18 in). The bark is smooth and grey fawn with small horizontal lines, flanged at the base of larger trees. The leaves are pinnate, 150–500 mm (5.9–19.7 in) long with five to fifteen leaflets. The leaflets are egg-shaped to lance-shaped, 50–130 mm (2.0–5.1 in) long and 7–65 mm (0.28–2.56 in) wide, the side leaflets sessile or on a petiolule up to 9 mm (0.35 in) long, the end leaflet on a petiolule 7–35 mm (0.28–1.38 in) long. The flowers are about 6 mm (0.24 in) in diameter and are borne in perfumed panicles 120–350 mm (4.7–13.8 in) long, the sepals 0.6–1 mm (0.024–0.039 in) long and the petals white, 2.5–3 mm (0.098–0.118 in) long. Flowering occurs from June to October and the fruit is a samara 20–45 mm (0.79–1.77 in) long, the seed about 3 mm (0.12 in) long.

== Taxonomy ==
The genus Pentaceras was first formally described in 1862 by George Bentham and Joseph Dalton Hooker in Genera Plantarum. In 1863, Ferdinand von Mueller described Cookia australis in Fragmenta phytographiae Australiae and in 1863, Bentham changed the name to Pentaceras australe in Flora Australiensis.

== Distribution and habitat ==
Pentaceras australe grows in rainforest, often dry rainforest, from near sea level to an altitude of 900 m (3,000 ft) and occurs from near Gympie in Queensland to near Stroud in New South Wales.

== Conservation status ==
Bastard crow's ash is classified as of "least concern" under the Queensland Government Nature Conservation Act 1992.
