= Decazyx =

Scientific classification
- Kingdom: Plantae
- Clade: Tracheophytes
- Clade: Angiosperms
- Clade: Eudicots
- Clade: Rosids
- Order: Sapindales
- Family: Rutaceae
- Subfamily: Zanthoxyloideae
- Genus: Decazyx; Pittier & S.F.Blake

Genus of plants

Decazyx is a genus of flowering plants belonging to the family Rutaceae.

Its native range is southern Mexico to Central America.

Species:

- Decazyx esparzae F.Chiang – southern Mexico, Honduras, and Costa Rica
- Decazyx macrophyllus Pittier & S.F.Blake – Guatemala and Honduras
