= Raulinoa =

Scientific classification
- Kingdom: Plantae
- Clade: Tracheophytes
- Clade: Angiosperms
- Clade: Eudicots
- Clade: Rosids
- Order: Sapindales
- Family: Rutaceae
- Subfamily: Zanthoxyloideae
- Genus: Raulinoa; R.S.Cowan

Species of flowering plant

Raulinoa is a monotypic genus of flowering plants belonging to the family Rutaceae. It only contains one known species, Raulinoa echinata R.S.Cowan

Its native range is southern Brazil.

The genus name of Raulinoa is in honour of Raulino Reitz (1919–1990), a Brazilian clergyman, historian, botanist, and botanical garden director. The Latin specific epithet of echinata refers to hedgehog, from echinus. It was first described and published in Sendtnera Vol.12 on page 90 in 1960.
