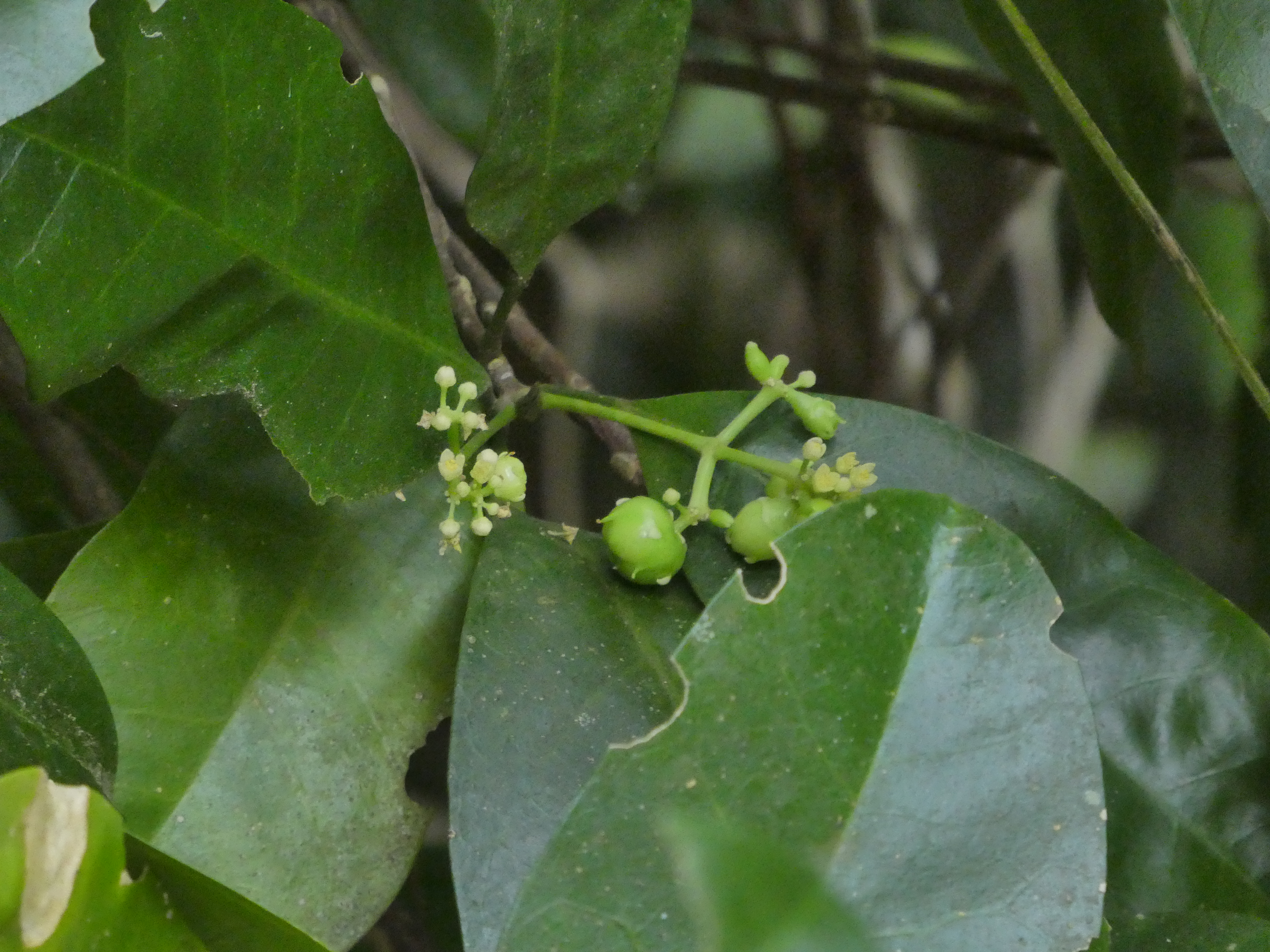
- Flowers and immature fruit

Conservation status
- Least Concern (IUCN 3.1)

Scientific classification
- Kingdom: Plantae
- Clade: Embryophytes
- Clade: Tracheophytes
- Clade: Spermatophytes
- Clade: Angiosperms
- Clade: Eudicots
- Clade: Rosids
- Order: Sapindales
- Family: Rutaceae
- Subfamily: Zanthoxyloideae
- Genus: Pitaviaster; T.G.Hartley
- Species: P. haplophyllus

Binomial name
- Pitaviaster haplophyllus (F.Muell.) T.G.Hartley

Synonyms
- Homotypic: Euodia haplophylla F.Muell.; Heterotypic: Acronychia haplophylla Engl.; Acronychia tetrandra F.Muell.; Jambolifera terandra Kuntze

= Pitaviaster =

Genus of plants

Pitaviaster is a monotypic genus (i.e. a genus that contains only one species) in the flowering plant family Rutaceae. The sole included species is Pitaviaster haplophyllus, commonly known as yellow aspen. It is a tree native to northeastern Queensland, Australia.
