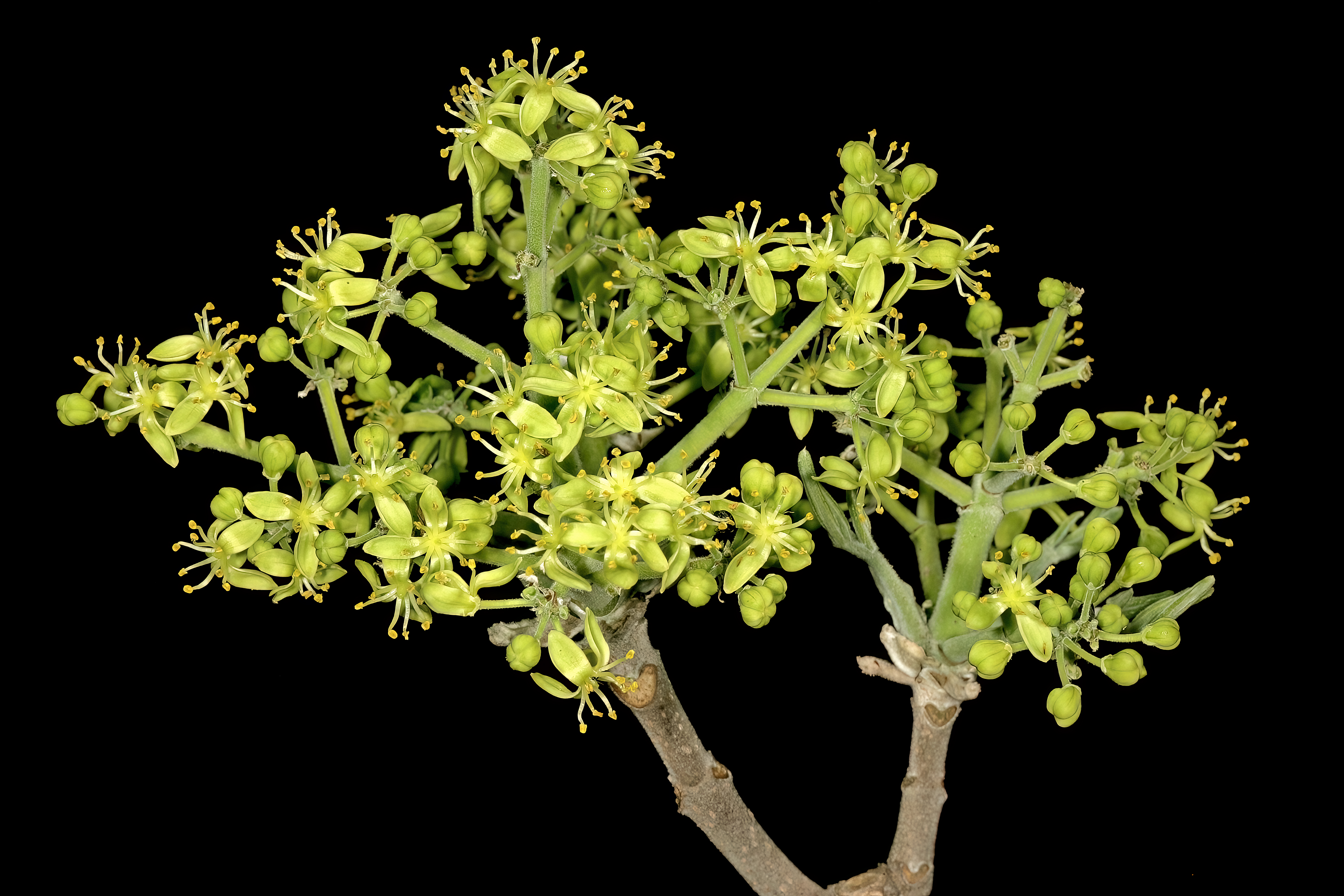
- Image of Fagaropsis angolensis

Scientific classification
- Kingdom: Plantae
- Clade: Tracheophytes
- Clade: Angiosperms
- Clade: Eudicots
- Clade: Rosids
- Order: Sapindales
- Family: Rutaceae
- Subfamily: Zanthoxyloideae
- Genus: Fagaropsis; Mildbr.

Species
- See text

= Fagaropsis =

Genus of Rutaceae plants

Fagaropsis is a genus of flowering plants in the rue family (Rutaceae), native to Africa and Madagascar. Its inclusion in the subtribe Toddalioideae is controversial. Trees or shrubs, they are valued for their timber and used in traditional medicine.

== Species ==
Species currently accepted by The Plant List are as follows:

- Fagaropsis angolensis (Engl.) H.M.Gardner
- Fagaropsis glabra Capuron
- Fagaropsis hildebrandtii (Engl.) Milne-Redh.
- Fagaropsis velutina Capuron
