= Euxylophora =

Conservation status
- Endangered (IUCN 3.1)

Scientific classification
- Kingdom: Plantae
- Clade: Embryophytes
- Clade: Tracheophytes
- Clade: Spermatophytes
- Clade: Angiosperms
- Clade: Eudicots
- Clade: Rosids
- Order: Sapindales
- Family: Rutaceae
- Subfamily: Zanthoxyloideae
- Genus: Euxylophora; Huber
- Species: E. paraensis

Binomial name
- Euxylophora paraensis Huber

Genus of plants

Euxylophora is a genus of flowering plants belonging to the family Rutaceae. It is a monotypic genus consisting of the species Euxylophora paraensis .

Its native range is Northern Brazil.
