= Phyllosma =

Scientific classification
- Kingdom: Plantae
- Clade: Tracheophytes
- Clade: Angiosperms
- Clade: Eudicots
- Clade: Rosids
- Order: Sapindales
- Family: Rutaceae
- Subfamily: Zanthoxyloideae
- Genus: Phyllosma; Bolus ex Schltr.

Genus of plants

Phyllosma is a genus of flowering plants belonging to the family Rutaceae.

Its native range is South African Republic.

== Species ==
Species:

- Phyllosma barosmoides (Dümmer) I.Williams
- Phyllosma capensis Bolus ex Schltr.
