= Rutaneblina =

Scientific classification
- Kingdom: Plantae
- Clade: Tracheophytes
- Clade: Angiosperms
- Clade: Eudicots
- Clade: Rosids
- Order: Sapindales
- Family: Rutaceae
- Subfamily: Zanthoxyloideae
- Genus: Rutaneblina; Steyerm. & Luteyn

Genus of flowering plants

Rutaneblina is a genus of flowering plants belonging to the family Rutaceae.

Its native range is Venezuela.

Species:

- Rutaneblina pusilla Steyerm. & Luteyn
