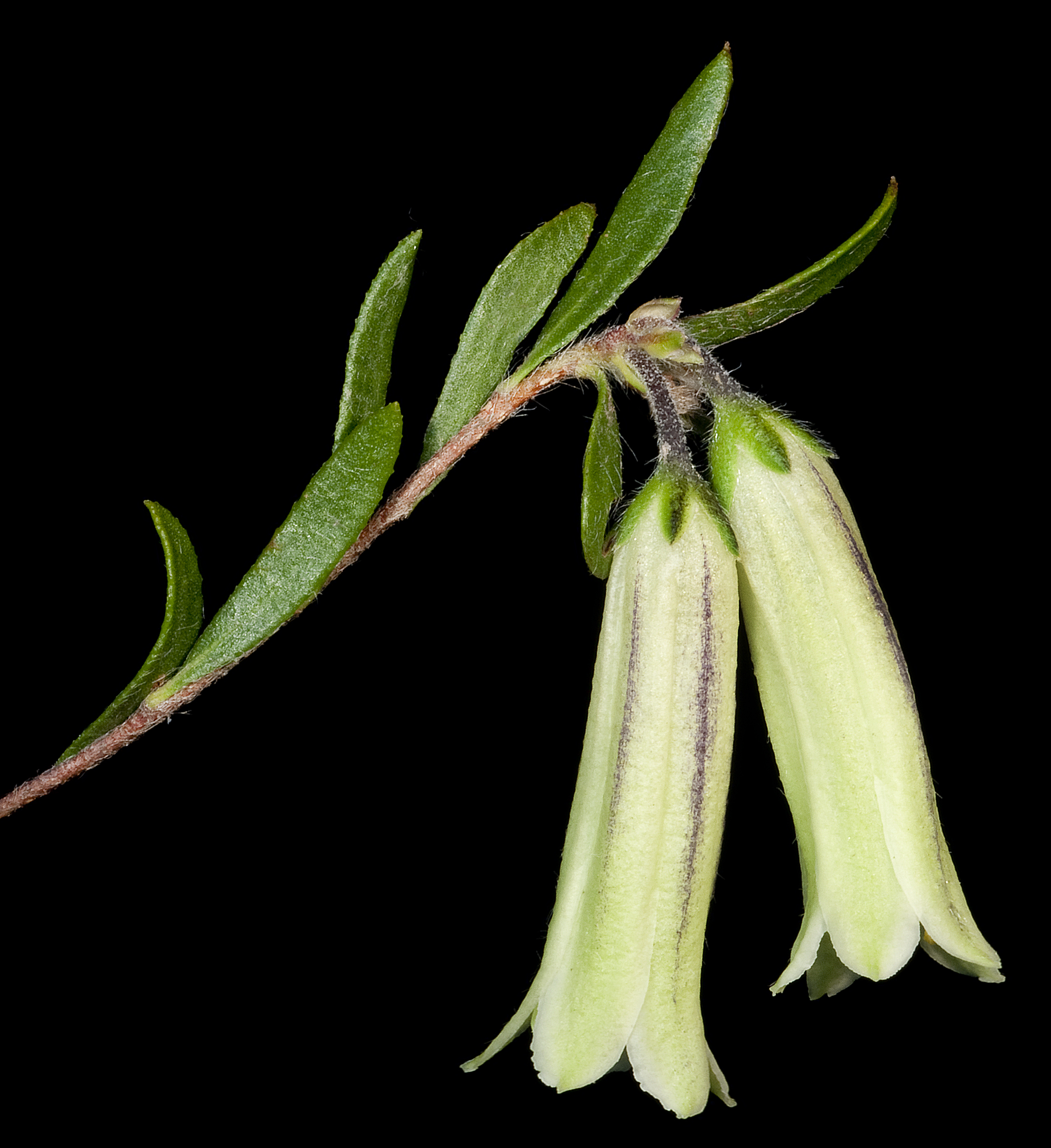

Scientific classification
- Kingdom: Plantae
- Clade: Embryophytes
- Clade: Tracheophytes
- Clade: Spermatophytes
- Clade: Angiosperms
- Clade: Eudicots
- Clade: Rosids
- Order: Sapindales
- Family: Rutaceae
- Subfamily: Zanthoxyloideae
- Genus: Muiriantha; C.A.Gardner
- Species: M. hassellii

Binomial name
- Muiriantha hassellii (F.Muell.) C.A.Gardner

= Muiriantha =

Genus of flowering plants

Muiriantha is a genus of plant containing the single species Muiriantha hassellii and is endemic to the south coast of Western Australia. It is a small shrub with branchlets covered sparsely in hairs, leathery leaves and yellowish-green pendulous flowers.

== Description ==
Muiriantha hassellii is a small under shrub to 0.15–30 cm (0.059–11.811 in) high with branchlets sparsely covered in soft, thin, separated, star-shaped hairs. The leaves are arranged alternately, aromatic, upright, narrowly elliptic, 10–15 mm (0.39–0.59 in) long, leathery, smooth and sparsely covered in soft hairs. The fragrant inflorescence are terminal on branches, tubular 2–2.5 cm (0.79–0.98 in) long, pendulous with small to medium sized bracts. The 5 yellowish-green petals are narrowly oblong to elliptic, rounded at the end, with a purple or green centre stripe, pedicels long and soft and weak hairs toward the petals apex. The spreading, dry fruit capsule ends in a sharp, short point. Flowering occurs from April to October.

== Taxonomy and naming ==
Muiriantha hassellii was first formally described in 1887 by Ferdinand von Mueller, who gave it the name Chorilaena hassellii and published the description in the Victorian Naturalist. In 1933 Charles Austin Gardner changed the name to Muiria hassellii, but the name Muiria was already used for a plant in the family Aizoaceae. In 1943 Gardner changed the name to Muiriantha hassellii in the Journal of the Royal Society of Western Australia. The specific epithet (hassellii) was named in honour of Albert Hassell who collected the plant from the west end of the Stirling Range.

== Distribution and habitat ==
This species has a restricted distribution found only in the south-west of Western Australia at Mount Manypeaks and the Stirling Range on heath in peaty sand, rocky clay on hillsides.
