= Macrostylis =

Scientific classification
- Kingdom: Plantae
- Clade: Embryophytes
- Clade: Tracheophytes
- Clade: Spermatophytes
- Clade: Angiosperms
- Clade: Eudicots
- Clade: Rosids
- Order: Sapindales
- Family: Rutaceae
- Subfamily: Zanthoxyloideae
- Genus: Macrostylis; Bartl. & H.L.Wendl. (1824)

Species
- 10; see text

Genus of flowering plants

Macrostylis is a genus of flowering plants in the family Rutaceae. It includes 10 species endemic to the Cape Provinces of South Africa.

- Macrostylis barbigera (L.f.) Bartl. & H.L.Wendl.
- Macrostylis cassiopoides (Turcz.) I.Williams
- Macrostylis cauliflora I.Williams
- Macrostylis crassifolia Sond.
- Macrostylis decipiens E.Mey. ex Sond.
- Macrostylis hirta E.Mey. ex Sond.
- Macrostylis ramulosa I.Williams
- Macrostylis squarrosa Bartl. & H.L.Wendl.
- Macrostylis tenuis E.Mey. ex Sond.
- Macrostylis villosa (Thunb.) Sond.
