= Crossosperma =

Scientific classification
- Kingdom: Plantae
- Clade: Tracheophytes
- Clade: Angiosperms
- Clade: Eudicots
- Clade: Rosids
- Order: Sapindales
- Family: Rutaceae
- Subfamily: Zanthoxyloideae
- Genus: Crossosperma; T.G.Hartley

Genus of flowering plants

Crossosperma is a genus of shrubs in the family Rutaceae. The genus is endemic to New Caledonia in the Pacific and contains two species. Its closest relative is the Australian Acradenia.
