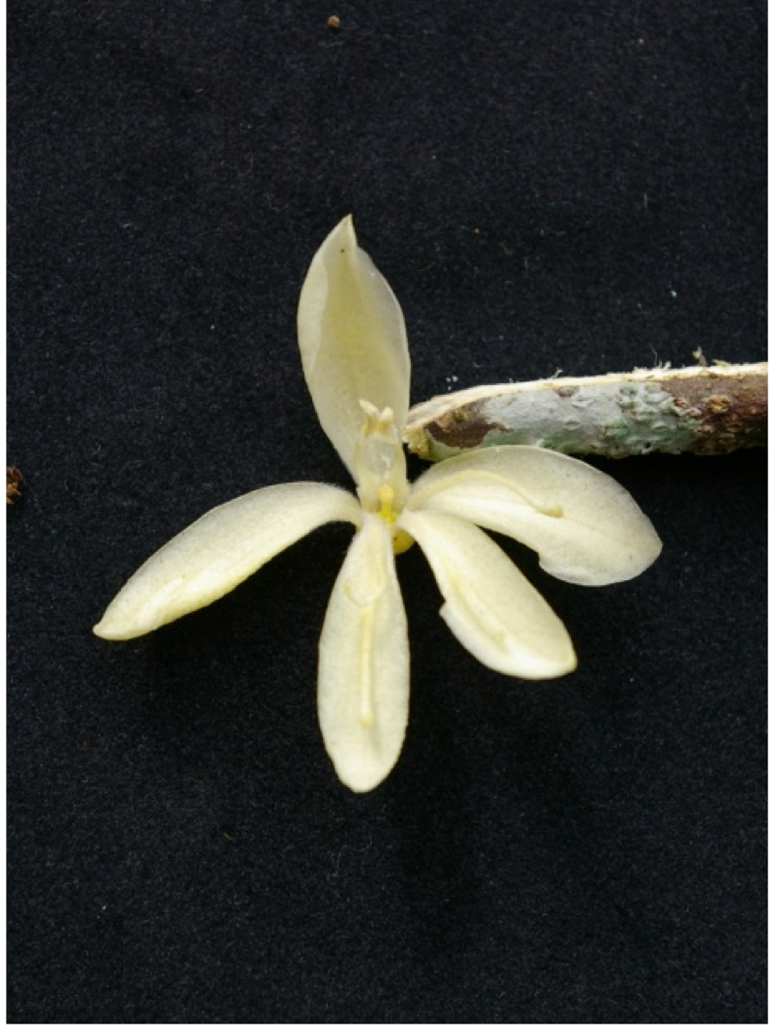
- Flower of Andreadoxa

Scientific classification
- Kingdom: Plantae
- Clade: Tracheophytes
- Clade: Angiosperms
- Clade: Eudicots
- Clade: Rosids
- Order: Sapindales
- Family: Rutaceae
- Subfamily: Zanthoxyloideae
- Genus: Andreadoxa; Kallunki

= Andreadoxa =

Genus of flowering plants

Andreadoxa is a genus of flowering plants belonging to the family Rutaceae.

Its native range is Northeastern Brazil.

Species:

- Andreadoxa flava Kallunki
