= Ticorea =

Scientific classification
- Kingdom: Plantae
- Clade: Tracheophytes
- Clade: Angiosperms
- Clade: Eudicots
- Clade: Rosids
- Order: Sapindales
- Family: Rutaceae
- Subfamily: Zanthoxyloideae
- Genus: Ticorea; Aubl.

Genus of flowering plants

Ticorea is a genus of flowering plants belonging to the family Rutaceae.

Its native range is Southern America.

Species:

- Ticorea diandra Kallunki
- Ticorea foetida Aubl.
