= Rauia =

Scientific classification
- Kingdom: Plantae
- Clade: Tracheophytes
- Clade: Angiosperms
- Clade: Eudicots
- Clade: Rosids
- Order: Sapindales
- Family: Rutaceae
- Subfamily: Zanthoxyloideae
- Genus: Rauia; Nees & Mart.

Genus of flowering plant

Rauia is a genus of flowering plants belonging to the family Rutaceae.

Its native range is southern Tropical America. It is found in Bolivia, (north, north-eastern and south-eastern) Brazil, Guyana, Peru, Suriname and Venezuela.

The genus name of Rauia is in honour of Ambrosius Rau (1784–1830), a German botanist and mineralogist. He was also a professor of natural history and forestry. It was first described and published in Nova Acta Phys.-Med. Acad. Caes. Leop.-Carol. Nat. Cur. Vol.11 on page 151 in 1823.

== Known species ==
According to Kew:

- Rauia nodosa (Engl.) Kallunki
- Rauia prancei W.A.Rodrigues & M.F.Silva
- Rauia resinosa Nees & Mart.
- Rauia spicata Haye
- Rauia subtruncata Steyerm.
