= Lubaria =

Scientific classification
- Kingdom: Plantae
- Clade: Tracheophytes
- Clade: Angiosperms
- Clade: Eudicots
- Clade: Rosids
- Order: Sapindales
- Family: Rutaceae
- Subfamily: Zanthoxyloideae
- Genus: Lubaria; Pittier

Genus of plants

Lubaria is a genus of flowering plants belonging to the family Rutaceae.

Its native range spans Costa Rica, Colombia, and Venezuela.

== Species ==
Species:

- Lubaria aroensis Pittier
- Lubaria heterophylla Londoño-Ech., A.M.Trujillo & Pérez-Zab.
