= Neoschmidia =

Scientific classification
- Kingdom: Plantae
- Clade: Tracheophytes
- Clade: Angiosperms
- Clade: Eudicots
- Clade: Rosids
- Order: Sapindales
- Family: Rutaceae
- Subfamily: Zanthoxyloideae
- Genus: Neoschmidia; T.G.Hartley

Synonyms
- Neoschmidea T.G.Hartley, orth. var.

Genus of shrubs

Neoschmidia (sometimes spelt Neoschmidea) is a genus of shrubs in the family Rutaceae. The genus is endemic to New Caledonia in the Pacific and contains two species.

== List of species ==
- Neoschmidia calycina
- Neoschmidia pallida
