= Ivodea =

Scientific classification
- Kingdom: Plantae
- Clade: Tracheophytes
- Clade: Angiosperms
- Clade: Eudicots
- Clade: Rosids
- Order: Sapindales
- Family: Rutaceae
- Subfamily: Zanthoxyloideae
- Genus: Ivodea; Capuron

Genus of plants

Ivodea is a genus of flowering plants belonging to the family Rutaceae.

Its native range is Comoros, Madagascar.

Species:

- Ivodea acuminata Rabarim., Rakoton., Phillipson & Lowry
- Ivodea alata Capuron
- Ivodea analalavensis Rabarim., Rakoton., Phillipson & Lowry
- Ivodea ankeranensis Rabarim., Rakoton., Phillipson & Lowry
- Ivodea antilahimenae Rabarim., Rakoton., Phillipson & Lowry
- Ivodea aymoniniana Rabarim., Rakoton., Phillipson, Lowry & M.Pignal
- Ivodea capuronii Rabarim., Rakoton., Phillipson & Lowry
- Ivodea choungiensis Labat, M.Pignal & O.Pascal
- Ivodea confertifolia Capuron
- Ivodea cordata Capuron
- Ivodea cristata Capuron
- Ivodea decaryana (H.Perrier) Rabarim., Rakoton., Phillipson & Lowry
- Ivodea delphinensis Rabarim., Rakoton., Phillipson & Lowry
- Ivodea lanceolata (Capuron) Rabarim., Rakoton., Phillipson & Lowry
- Ivodea macrocarpa Rabarim., Rakoton., Phillipson & Lowry
- Ivodea mahaboensis Rabarim., Rakoton., Phillipson & Lowry
- Ivodea mahanarica Capuron
- Ivodea mananarensis Rabarim., Rakoton., Phillipson & Lowry
- Ivodea mayottensis Labat & M.Pignal
- Ivodea menabeensis Capuron
- Ivodea moheliensis M.Pignal & Labat
- Ivodea nana Capuron
- Ivodea occidentalis Rabarim., Rakoton., Phillipson & Lowry
- Ivodea petrae Rabarim., Rakoton., Phillipson & Lowry
- Ivodea ravelonarivoi Rabarim., Rakoton., Phillipson & Lowry
- Ivodea razakamalalae Rabarim., Rakoton., Phillipson & Lowry
- Ivodea reticulata Capuron
- Ivodea sahafariensis Capuron
- Ivodea toliarensis Rabarim., Rakoton., Phillipson & Lowry
- Ivodea trichocarpa Capuron
