= Megastigma =

Scientific classification
- Kingdom: Plantae
- Clade: Tracheophytes
- Clade: Angiosperms
- Clade: Eudicots
- Clade: Rosids
- Order: Sapindales
- Family: Rutaceae
- Subfamily: Zanthoxyloideae
- Genus: Megastigma; Hook.f.

Genus of plants

Megastigma is a genus of flowering plants belonging to the family Rutaceae.

Its native range is Mexico to Central America.

Species:

- Megastigma balsense F.Chiang & J.Jiménez Ram.
- Megastigma chiangii J.Jiménez Ram. & Cruz Durán
- Megastigma galeottii Baill.
- Megastigma morenoi Cuevas & Guzm.-Hern.
- Megastigma skinneri Benth. & Hook.f.
