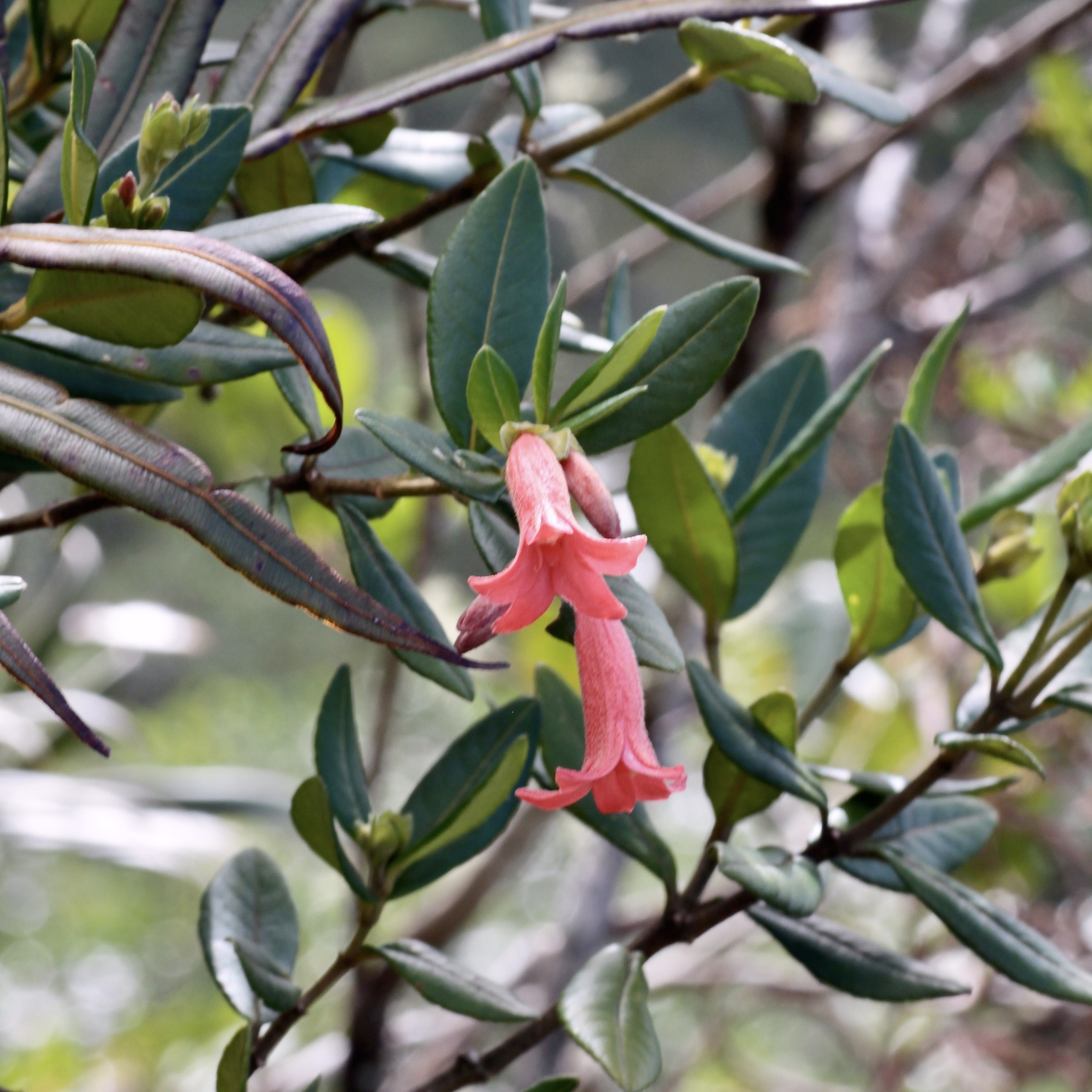
- Raveniopsis ruellioides from Mount Roraima.

Scientific classification
- Kingdom: Plantae
- Clade: Tracheophytes
- Clade: Angiosperms
- Clade: Eudicots
- Clade: Rosids
- Order: Sapindales
- Family: Rutaceae
- Subfamily: Zanthoxyloideae
- Genus: Raveniopsis; Gleason

= Raveniopsis =

Genus of flowering plant

Raveniopsis is a genus of flowering plants belonging to the family Rutaceae.

It is native to northern Brazil, Guyana and Venezuela.

The genus name of Raveniopsis is in honour of Jean François Ravin (18th century), a French doctor, professor of botany and medicine at the University of Coimbra in Portugal. It was first described in 1939.

== Known species ==
According to Kew:

- Raveniopsis abyssicola R.S.Cowan
- Raveniopsis aracaensis Kallunki & Steyerm.
- Raveniopsis breweri Steyerm.
- Raveniopsis campinicola Kallunki
- Raveniopsis capitata R.S.Cowan
- Raveniopsis cowaniana Steyerm. & Luteyn
- Raveniopsis fraterna R.S.Cowan
- Raveniopsis jauaensis Steyerm.
- Raveniopsis linearis (Gleason) R.S.Cowan
- Raveniopsis microphyllus K.Wurdack
- Raveniopsis necopinata Kallunki
- Raveniopsis nubicola R.S.Cowan
- Raveniopsis paruana (R.S.Cowan) R.S.Cowan
- Raveniopsis peduncularis Pittier & Lasser
- Raveniopsis ruellioides (Oliv.) R.S.Cowan
- Raveniopsis sericea R.S.Cowan
- Raveniopsis stelligera (R.S.Cowan) R.S.Cowan
- Raveniopsis steyermarkii R.S.Cowan
- Raveniopsis tomentosa Gleason
- Raveniopsis trifoliolata R.S.Cowan
