= Perryodendron =

Scientific classification
- Kingdom: Plantae
- Clade: Tracheophytes
- Clade: Angiosperms
- Clade: Eudicots
- Clade: Rosids
- Order: Sapindales
- Family: Rutaceae
- Subfamily: Zanthoxyloideae
- Genus: Perryodendron; T.G.Hartley
- Species: P. parviflorum

Binomial name
- Perryodendron parviflorum (C.T.White) T.G.Hartley

Synonyms
- Melicope parviflora C.T.White

Species of flowering plant

Perryodendron is a monotypic genus of flowering plants belonging to the family Rutaceae. The only known species is Perryodendron parviflorum.

The species is found in New Guinea.

The genus name of Perryodendron is in honour of Lily May Perry (1895–1992), a Canadian-American botanist who worked at Arnold Arboretum and is most known for detailed compilation of information on medicinal plants of East and Southeast Asia. The Latin specific epithet of parviflorum is a compound, parv- meaning little and '-florum' meaning flower. It was first described and published in Adansonia, sér.3, Vol.19 on page 198 in 1997.
