= Desmotes =

Scientific classification
- Kingdom: Plantae
- Clade: Tracheophytes
- Clade: Angiosperms
- Clade: Eudicots
- Clade: Rosids
- Order: Sapindales
- Family: Rutaceae
- Genus: Desmotes; Kallunki
- Species: D. incomparabilis

Binomial name
- Desmotes incomparabilis (H.P.Riley) Kallunki

Genus of flowering plants

Desmotes is a monotypic genus of flowering plants belonging to the family Rutaceae. The only species is Desmotes incomparabilis.

The species is found in Central America.
