= Afraurantium =

Scientific classification
- Kingdom: Plantae
- Clade: Tracheophytes
- Clade: Angiosperms
- Clade: Eudicots
- Clade: Rosids
- Order: Sapindales
- Family: Rutaceae
- Genus: Afraurantium; A.Chev.

Genus of flowering plants

Afraurantium is a genus of flowering plants belonging to the family Rutaceae.

Its native range is Western Tropical Africa.

Species:

- Afraurantium senegalense A.Chev.
