= Euchaetis (plant) =

Scientific classification
- Kingdom: Plantae
- Clade: Tracheophytes
- Clade: Angiosperms
- Clade: Eudicots
- Clade: Rosids
- Order: Sapindales
- Family: Rutaceae
- Subfamily: Zanthoxyloideae
- Genus: Euchaetis; Bartl. & H.L.Wendl. (1824)

Genus of flowering plants

Euchaetis is a genus of plant in family Rutaceae. It includes 23 species native to the Cape Provinces of South Africa.

== Species ==
23 species are accepted.

- Euchaetis albertiniana I.Williams
- Euchaetis avisylvana I.Williams
- Euchaetis burchellii Dümmer
- Euchaetis cristagalli I.Williams
- Euchaetis diosmoides (Schltr.) I.Williams
- Euchaetis elata Eckl. & Zeyh.
- Euchaetis elsieae I.Williams
- Euchaetis ericoides Dümmer
- Euchaetis esterhuyseniae I.Williams
- Euchaetis flexilis Eckl. & Zeyh.
- Euchaetis glabra I.Williams
- Euchaetis glomerata Bartl. & H.L.Wendl.
- Euchaetis intonsa I.Williams
- Euchaetis laevigata Turcz.
- Euchaetis linearis Sond.
- Euchaetis longibracteata Schltr.
- Euchaetis longicornis I.Williams
- Euchaetis meridionalis I.Williams
- Euchaetis pungens (Bartl. & H.L.Wendl.) I.Williams
- Euchaetis scabricosta I.Williams
- Euchaetis schlechteri Schinz
- Euchaetis tricarpellata I.Williams
- Euchaetis vallis-simiae I.Williams
