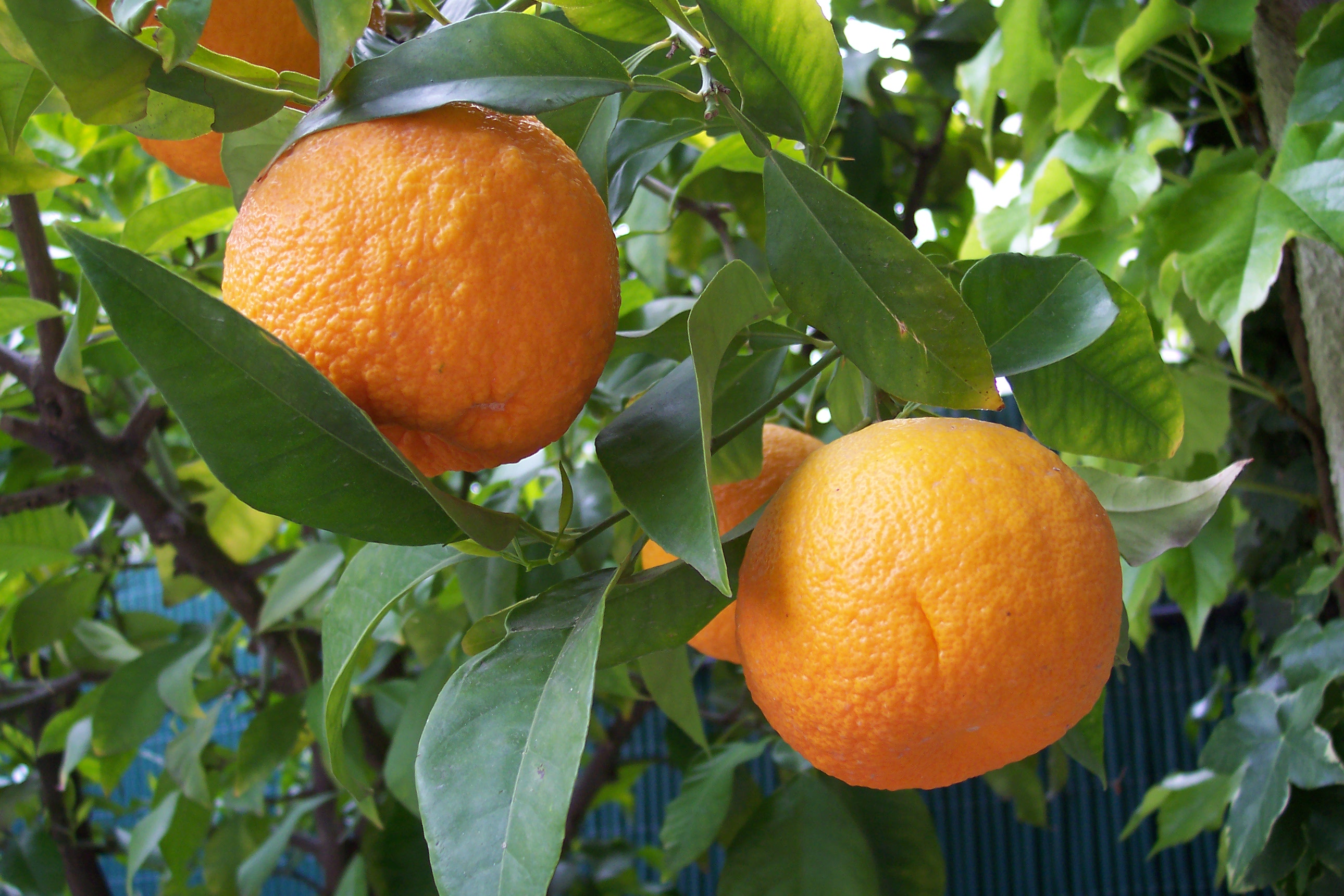
- Bitter orange (Citrus aurantium)

Scientific classification
- Kingdom: Plantae
- Clade: Tracheophytes
- Clade: Angiosperms
- Clade: Eudicots
- Clade: Rosids
- Order: Sapindales
- Family: Rutaceae
- Subfamily: Aurantioideae
- Tribe: Citreae

Genera
- See text

= Citreae =

Tribe of flowering plants

Citreae is one of the two tribes of the flowering plant family Rutaceae, subfamily Aurantioideae, the other being Clauseneae.

== Subtribes and genera ==
Three sub-tribes are included:

- Triphasiinae
  - Luvunga Buch.-Ham. ex Wight & Arn.
  - Merope M.Roem.
  - Monanthocitrus
  - Pamburus Swingle
  - Paramignya Wight
  - Triphasia
  - Wenzelia Merr.
- Balsamocitrinae
  - Aegle Corrêa – bael
  - Aeglopsis Swingle
  - Afraegle (Swingle) Engl.
  - Balsamocitrus Stapf
  - Feroniella Swingle
  - Limonia L. – curd fruit
  - Swinglea Merr.
- Citrinae
  - Atalantia
  - Burkillanthus
  - Citropsis
  - Citrus
  - Clymenia (may belong in Citrus)
  - Hesperethusa
  - Naringi
  - Poncirus – trifoliate orange (may belong in Citrus)
  - Pleiospermium
  - Severinia

Notable species in the Citrinae group include Bergamot orange, calamondin, citron, grapefruit, lemon, lime, orange, pummelo, tangelo, and tangerine, all of which are in the genus Citrus.
