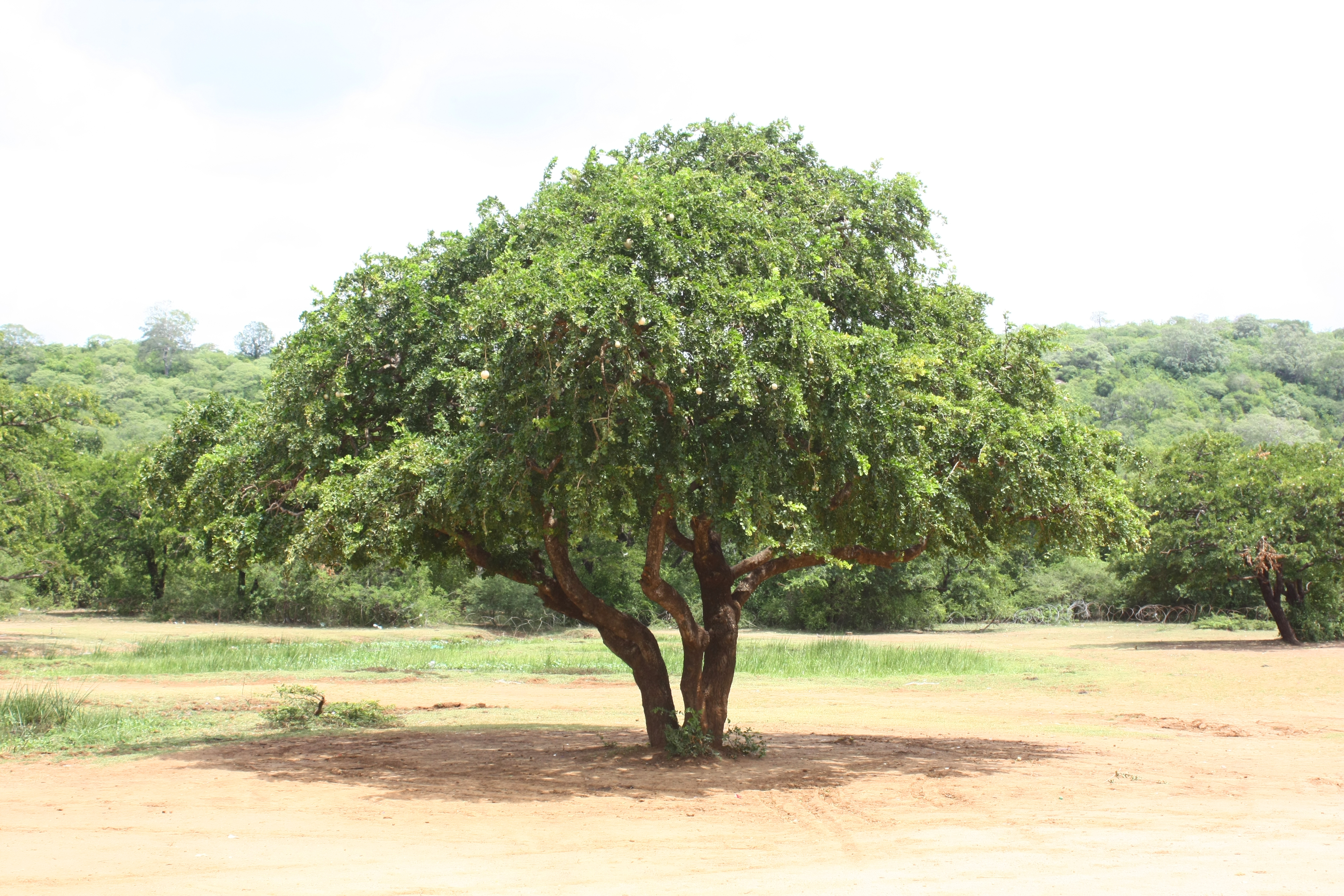
- In Trincomalee, Sri Lanka

Scientific classification
- Kingdom: Plantae
- Clade: Tracheophytes
- Clade: Angiosperms
- Clade: Eudicots
- Clade: Rosids
- Order: Sapindales
- Family: Rutaceae
- Subfamily: Aurantioideae
- Genus: Limonia; L.
- Species: L. acidissima

Binomial name
- Limonia acidissima L.

Synonyms
- Genus: Anisifolium Rumph. ex Kuntze; Feronia Corrêa; Hesperethusa M.Roem.; Winterlia Dennst.; Species: Schinus limonia L.; Crateva balangas K.D.Koenig; Crateva vallanga J.Koenig ex Wight & Arn.; Anisifolium curvispina (Miq.) Kuntze; Anisifolium limonia Kuntze; Anisifolium spectabile (Miq.) Kuntze; Feronia balanghas (K.D.Koenig) Steud.; Feronia elephantum Corrêa; Feronia limonia (L.) Swingle; Hesperethusa acidissima (L.) M.Roem.; Hesperethusa ambigua M.Roem.; Limonia ambigua DC.; Limonia curvispina Miq.; Limonia dulcis J.F.Gmel.; Limonia elephantum (Corrêa) Panigrahi; Limonia engleriana Perkins; Limonia pinnatifolia Houtt.; Limonia spectabilis Miq.; Murraya odorata Blanco

= Limonia acidissima =

Species of tree

Limonia acidissima is the only species within the monotypic genus Limonia. Common names for this South Asian species in English include wood-apple, elephant-apple, and kapittha. It is sometimes also called monkey fruit.

== Description ==
Limonia acidissima is a large tree growing to 9 metres (30 ft) tall with rough, spiny bark. The leaves are pinnate, with 5–7 leaflets, each leaflet 25–35 mm long and 10–20 mm broad, with a citrus-scent when crushed. The flowers are white and have five petals. The large fruit is a berry 5–9 cm diameter, and may be sweet or sour. It has a very hard rind similar to a rock, which can be cracked open. It appears greenish-brown on the outside, and contains sticky brown pulp and small white seeds. The fruit looks similar in appearance to the bael fruit (Aegle marmelos).

== Taxonomy ==
A number of other species formerly included in the genus are now treated in the related genera Atalantia, Citropsis, Citrus, Glycosmis, Luvunga, Murraya, Micromelum, Naringi, Pamburus, Pleiospermium, Severinia, Skimmia, Swinglea, and Triphasia.

== Distribution ==
Limonia acidissima is native to India (including the Andaman Islands), Bangladesh, and Sri Lanka. The species has also been introduced to Indochina and Malesia; the Book of Sui records of khāpittha (in Middle Chinese: 歌畢他 ka.pjit.tha) sighted in one "Zhenla" in the latter Indochina region dated to 616 AD, this is reflected in the Khmer loan ខ្វិត khvit found in toponyms dating to the Angkorean era.

== Uses ==
The fruit is used to make a fruit juice with astringent properties and jams. Ripe fruit can be used as a pickle (mashed with green chili pepper, sugar and salt only).

In some parts of India, mainly Gujarat, the fruit pulp is used to make chutney, which is then used as a main condiment in and on top of meals, especially in winter. The wood apple is ubiquitous in Tamil Nadu, where the ripe fruit is eaten mixed with sugar or another sweetener. The name of the wood apple (vilam) is used as the canonical example of a two-syllable prosodic foot in traditional Tamil song. It is used in Indian folk medicine for treating diarrhea, urinary infections, dysentery and piles.

In Myanmar, the wood is used to make the distinctive local face cream thanaka.

== In mythology ==
The kapittha root was said to be prescribed by the Gandharvas to Varuna in increasing his virility.

== Nutrition ==
The fruit contains a considerable amount of protein, carbohydrate, iron, fat, calcium, and vitamins B and C.

Woodapple, raw (daily value)
Nutritional value per 100 g (3.5 oz)
- Energy: 518.816 kJ (124.000 kcal)
- Carbohydrates: 18.1 g
- Sugars: 7 g
- Dietary fiber: 5 g
- Fat: 3.7 g
- Protein: 7.1 g
Vitamins and minerals
Vitamins	Quantity %DV^{†}
Vitamin A equiv. beta-Carotene	1% 61 μg
Thiamine (B1)	3% 0.04 mg
Riboflavin (B2)	1308% 17 mg
Niacin (B3)	50% 8 mg
Vitamin C	3% 3 mg
Minerals	Quantity %DV^{†}
Calcium	10% 130 mg
Iron	33% 6 mg
Magnesium	10% 41 mg
Manganese	783% 18 mg
Phosphorus	9% 110 mg
Zinc	91% 10 mg
- Other constituents: Quantity
- Water: 64.2 g
- values are for edible portion
- ^{†}Percentages estimated using US recommendations for adults. Source: Fruit - Wood Apple, archived from the original on July 9, 2022

== Gallery ==
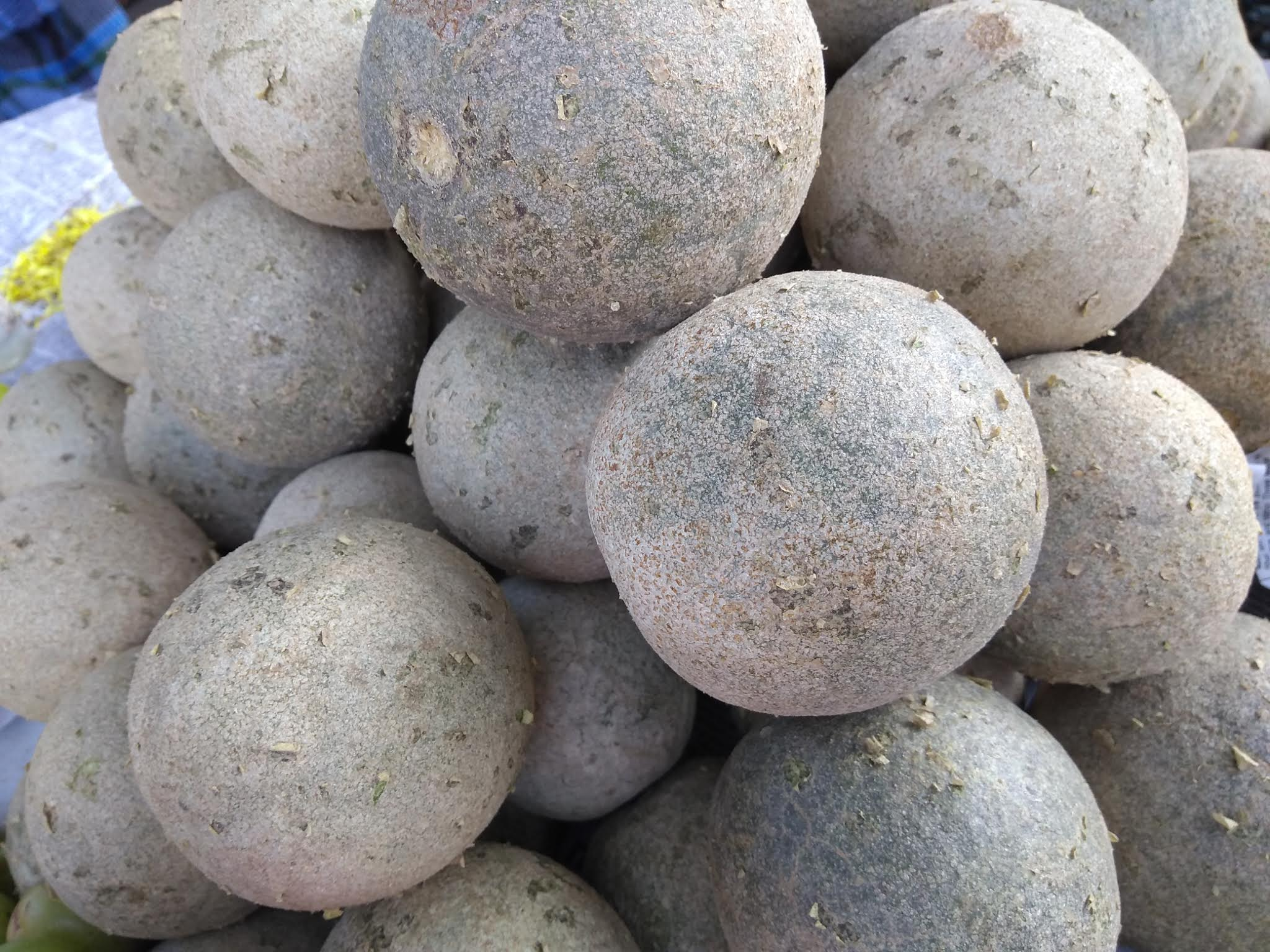
Woodapple fruit

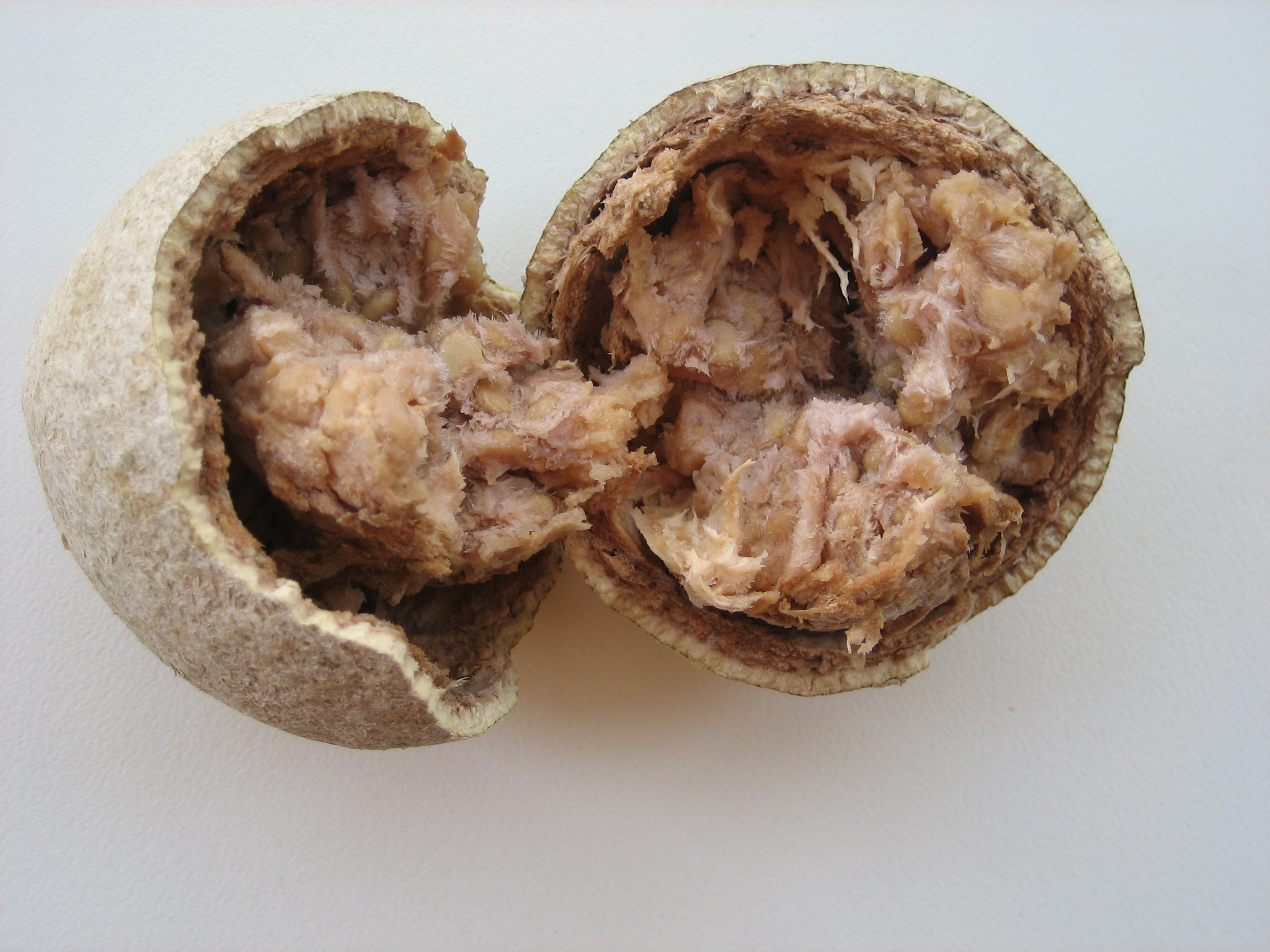
Opened woodapple fruit

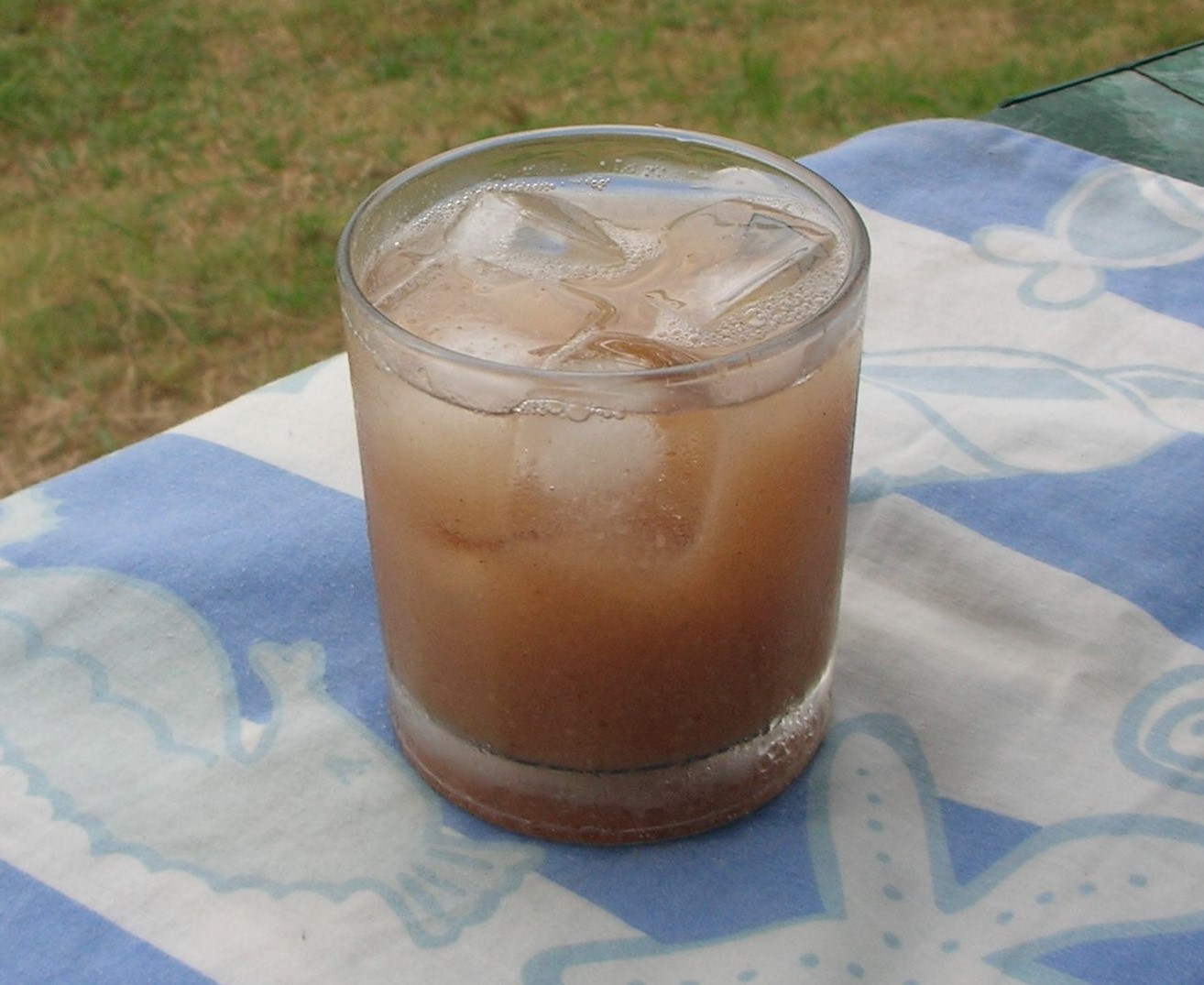
A glass of woodapple juice
