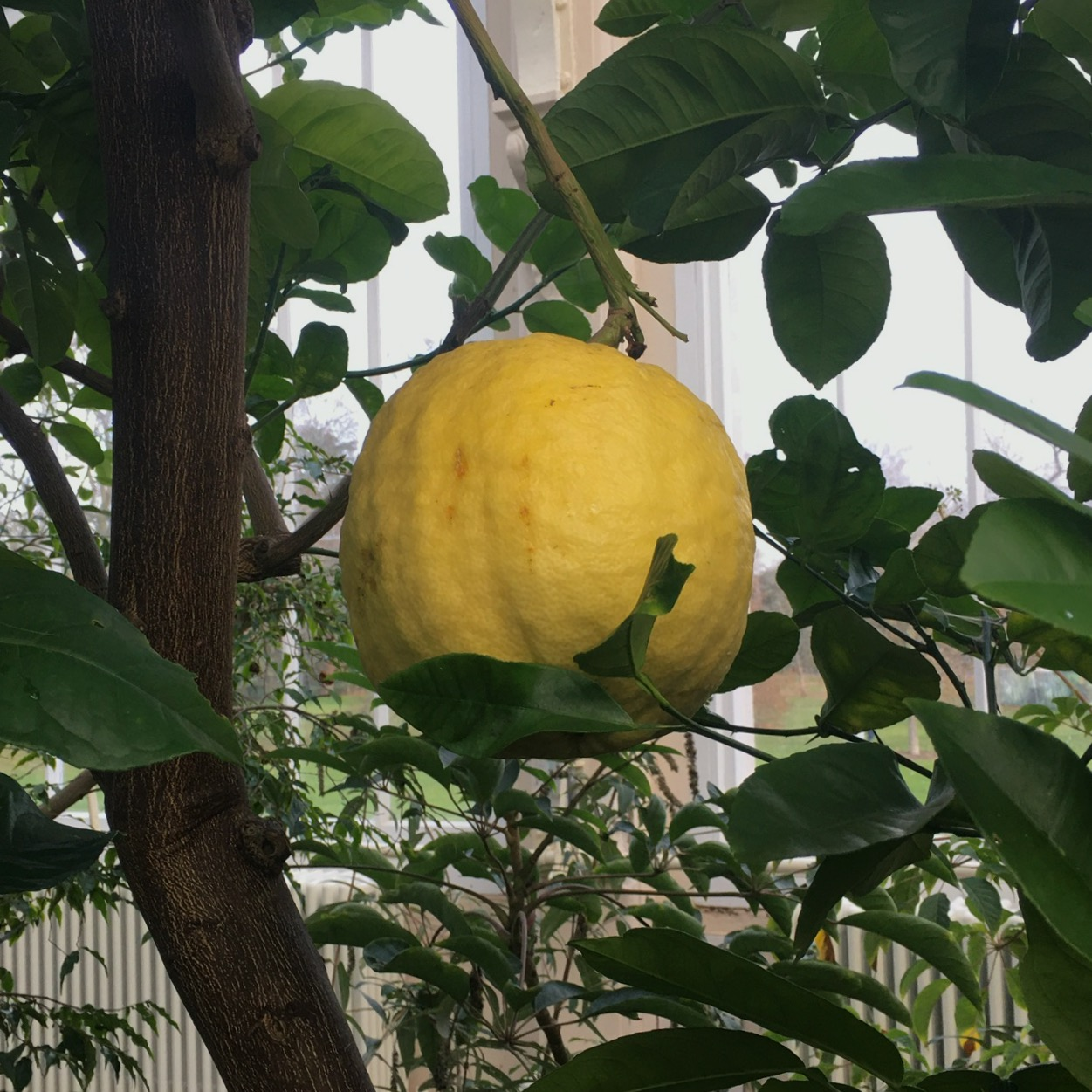
- An Imperial lemon tree

Scientific classification
- Kingdom: Plantae
- Clade: Tracheophytes
- Clade: Angiosperms
- Clade: Eudicots
- Clade: Rosids
- Order: Sapindales
- Family: Rutaceae
- Subfamily: Aurantioideae
- Genus: Citrus
- Species: C. limon × C. paradisi

= Imperial lemon =

Fruit

The Imperial lemon is thought to be a lemon and grapefruit hybrid. Its fruit is slightly larger than a lemon and has a more rounded shape.
