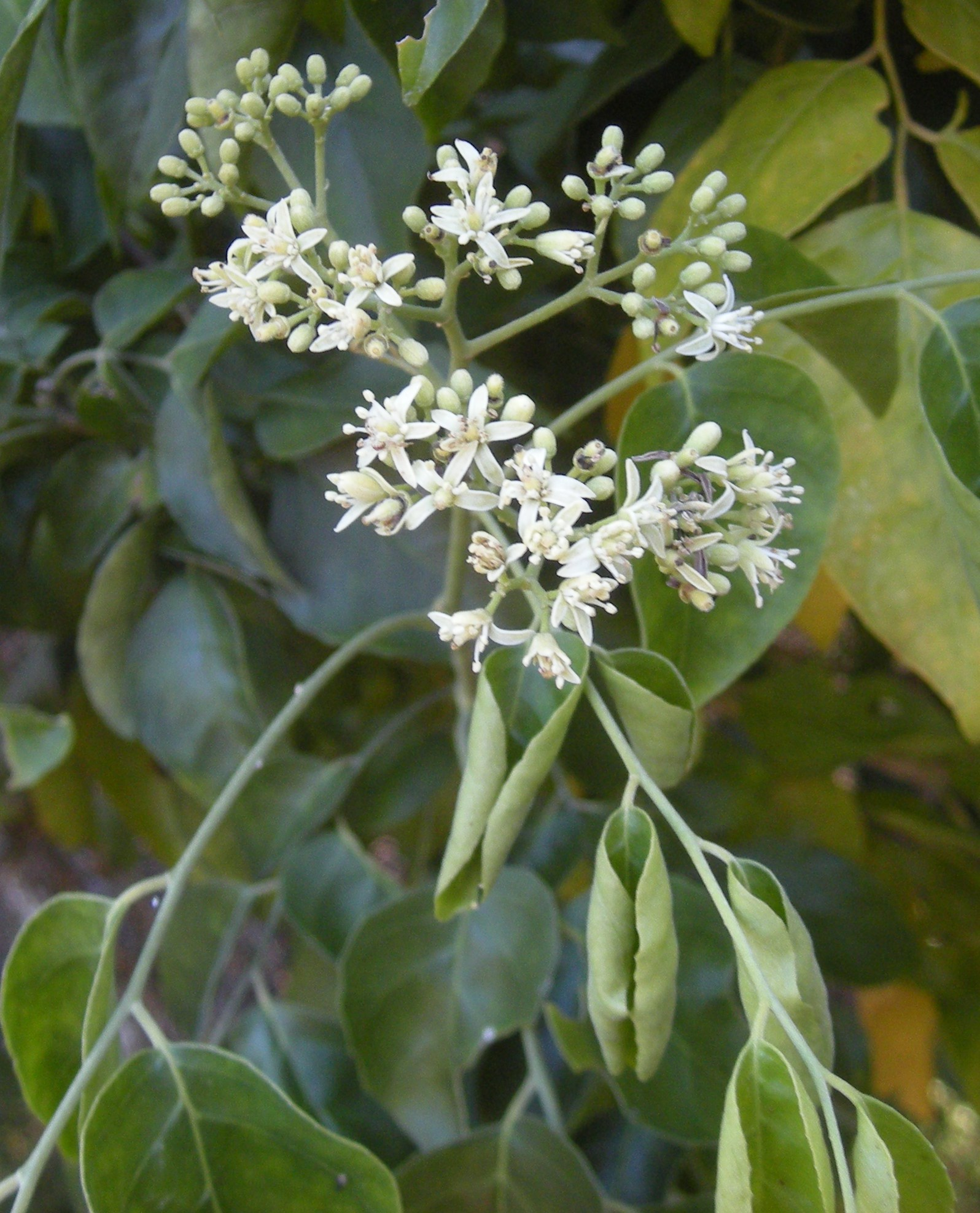
- Micromelum minutum flowers

Scientific classification
- Kingdom: Plantae
- Clade: Tracheophytes
- Clade: Angiosperms
- Clade: Eudicots
- Clade: Rosids
- Order: Sapindales
- Family: Rutaceae
- Subfamily: Aurantioideae
- Tribe: Clauseneae; Wight & Arn (1834)

Genera
- Clausena; Glycosmis; Merrillia; Micromelum; Murraya

= Clauseneae =

Tribe of flowering plants

Clauseneae is one of the two tribes of the flowering plant family Rutaceae, subfamily Aurantioideae, the other being Citreae, which includes Citrus.

The tribe comprises five genera: Micromelum, Glycosmis, Clausena, Murraya, and Merrillia; considered to be the more primitive genera of the orange subfamily. The members can be distinguished from the Citreae tribe by their odd-pinnate leaves, with the leaflets alternately attached to the rachis.
