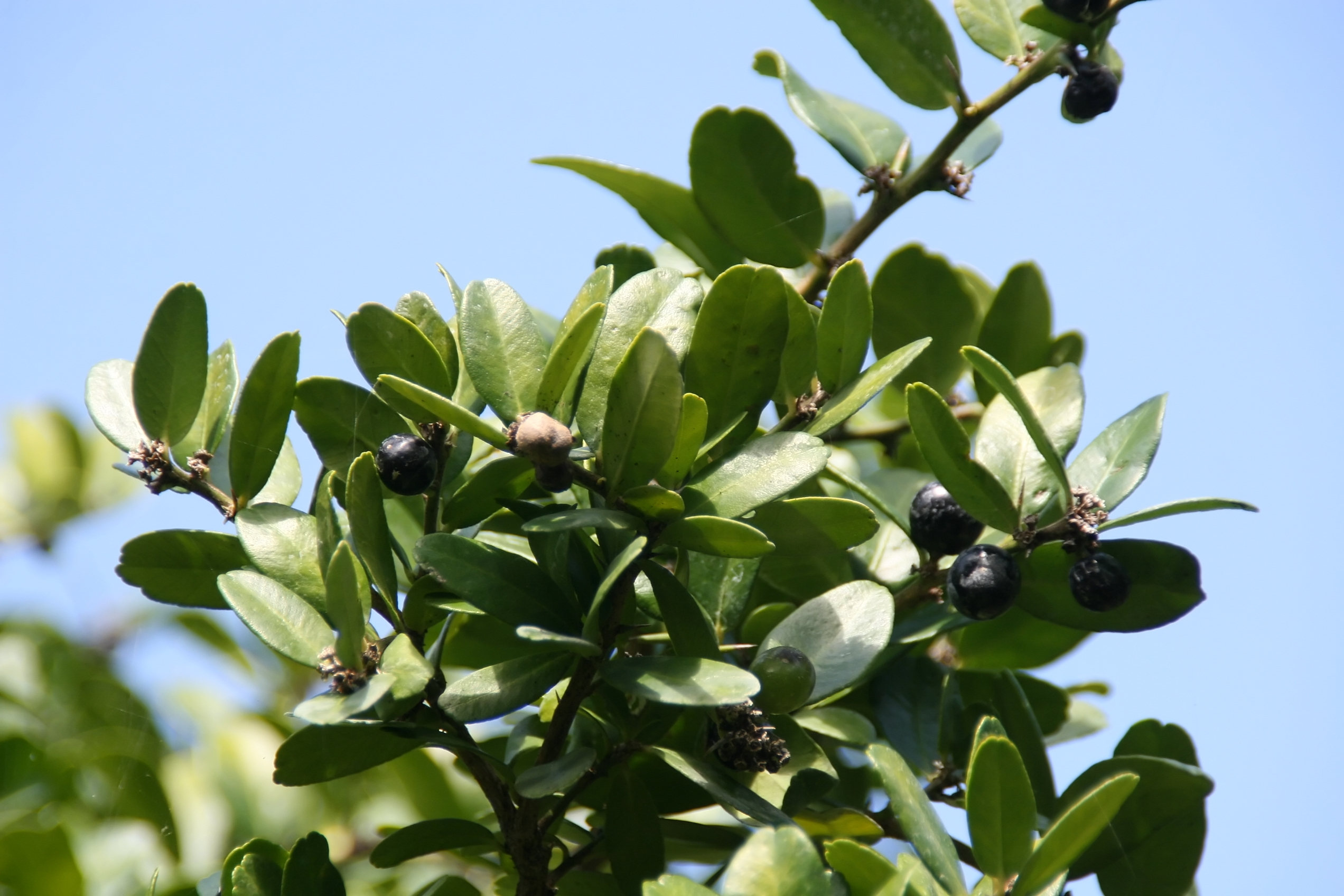

Scientific classification
- Kingdom: Plantae
- Clade: Tracheophytes
- Clade: Angiosperms
- Clade: Eudicots
- Clade: Rosids
- Order: Sapindales
- Family: Rutaceae
- Genus: Atalantia
- Species: A. buxifolia

Binomial name
- Atalantia buxifolia (Poir.) Oliv. ex Benth.

= Atalantia buxifolia =

Species of plant

Atalantia buxifolia, synonym Severinia buxifolia, is a species of plant in the family Rutaceae, related to Citrus and Citropsis. Its common names include Chinese box-orange, box orange or boxthorn. It is native to southern China. It produces small black berries that resemble black currants. The fruits are eaten by birds that disperse its seeds. It is an evergreen in the wild.
