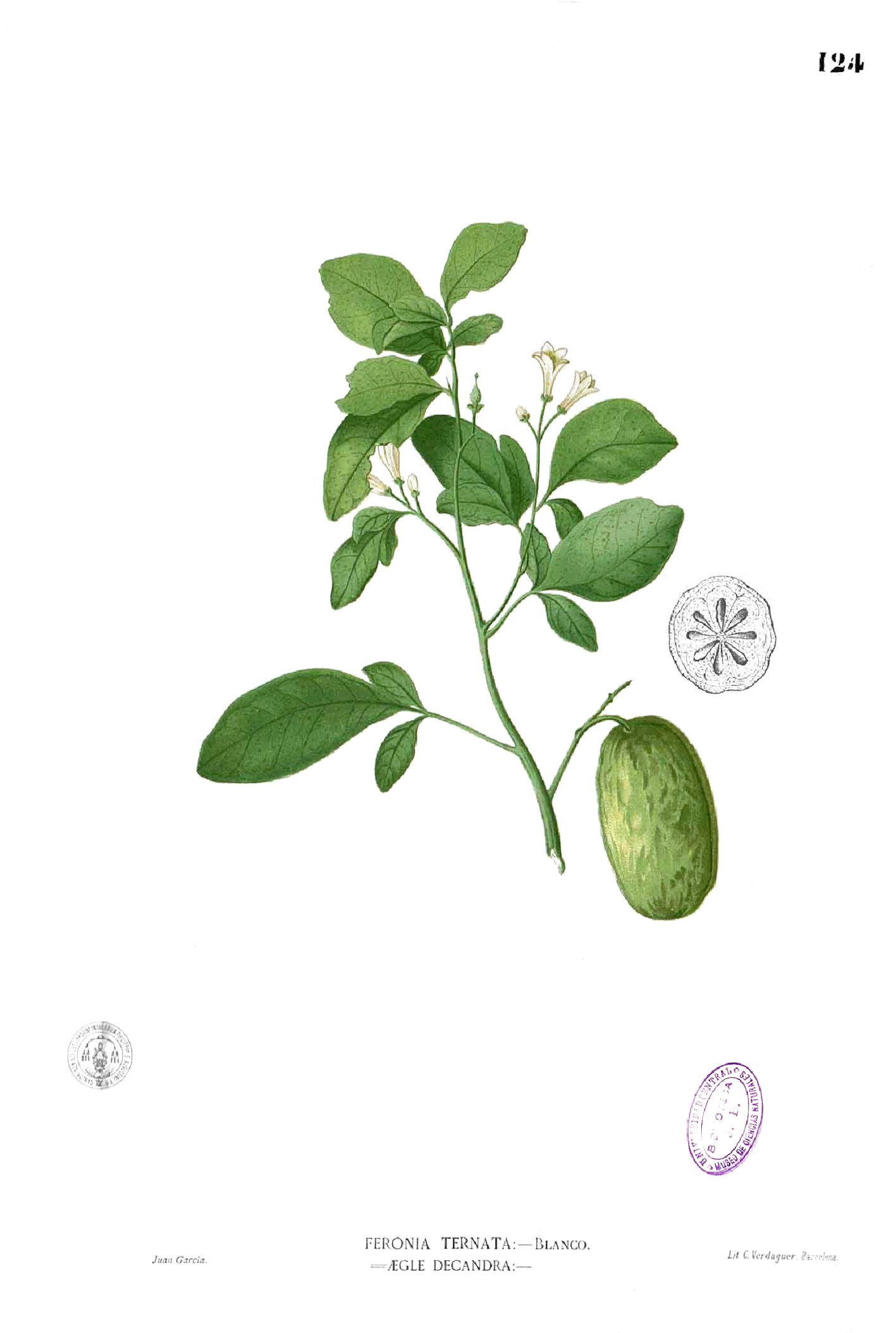
- Swinglea glutinosa, tabog

Scientific classification
- Kingdom: Plantae
- Clade: Tracheophytes
- Clade: Angiosperms
- Clade: Eudicots
- Clade: Rosids
- Order: Sapindales
- Family: Rutaceae
- Subfamily: Aurantioideae; Eaton

Genera
- See text.

Synonyms
- Citroideae

= Aurantioideae =

Subfamily of flowering plants

Aurantioideae (sometimes known as Citroideae) is the subfamily within the rue and citrus family (Rutaceae) that contains the citrus. The subfamily's center of diversity is in the monsoon region of eastern Australasia, extending west through South Asia into Africa, and eastwards into Polynesia.

Notable members include citrus (genus Citrus), bael (Aegle marmelos), curd fruit (Limonia acidissima), species of genus Murraya such as curry tree (M. koenigii) and orange jessamine (M. paniculata), and the small genus Clausena.

== Description ==
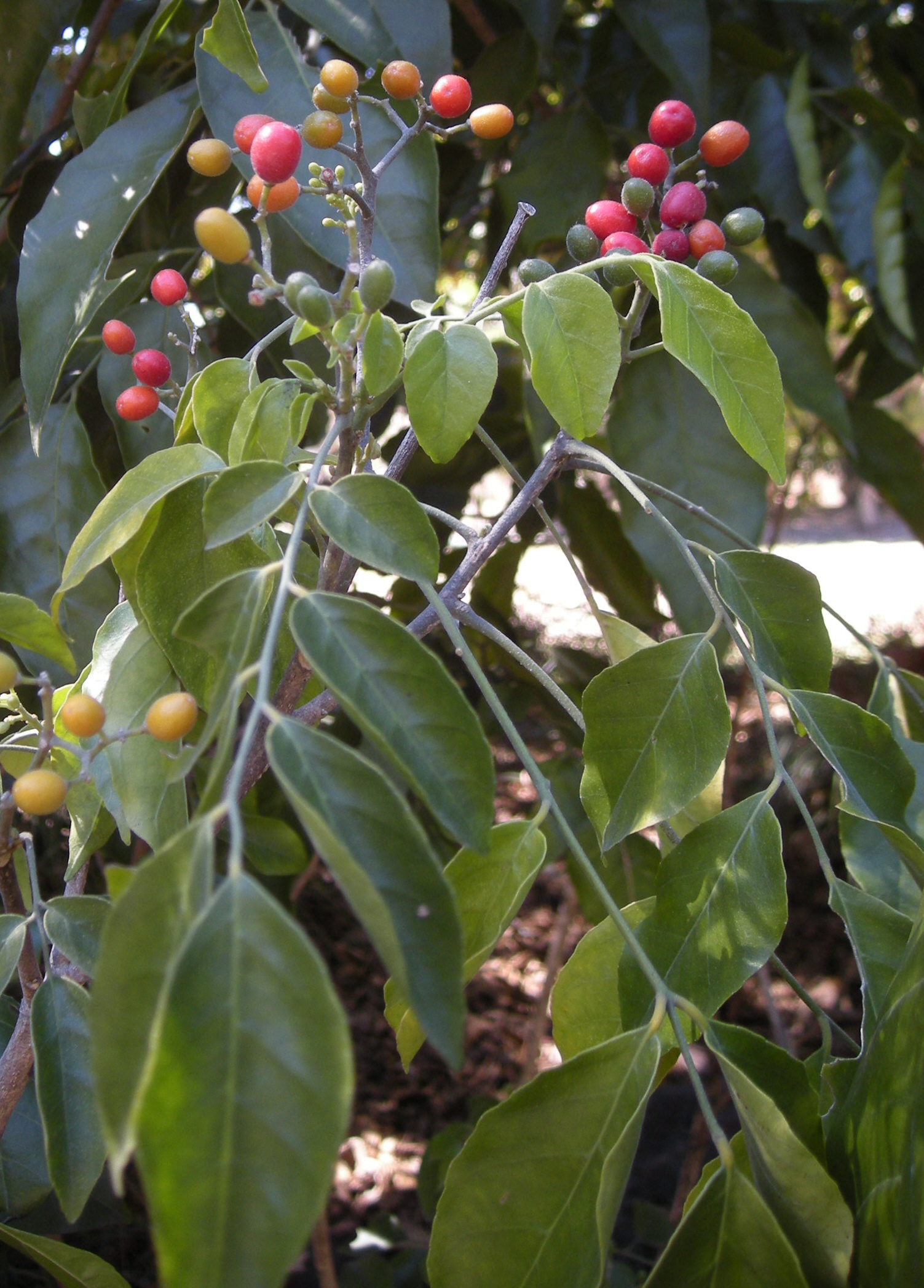
Micromelum minutum

Aurantioideae are smallish trees or large shrubs, or rarely lianas. Their flowers are typically white and fragrant. Their fruit are very characteristic hesperidia, usually of rounded shape and colored in green, yellowish or orange hues.

== Taxonomy ==
The subfamily has been divided into two tribes, the ancestral Clauseneae and the more advanced Citreae, as in a 1967 classification. A 2021 classification by Appelhans et al. based on a molecular phylogenetic study of almost 90% of the genera of the family Rutaceae places about 27 genera in the subfamily, stating that it was not yet feasible to produce a division into tribes. Other sources vary in the precise genera they accept.

=== Genera ===
Genera placed in Aurantioideae in Appelhans et al.'s 2021 classification of the Rutaceae into subfamilies are:

- Aegle Corrêa – bael
- Aeglopsis Swingle
- Afraegle Engl.
- Atalantia Corrêa
- Balsamocitrus Stapf
- Bergera J.Koenig ex L. – may be included in Murraya
- Burkillanthus Swingle
- Citropsis (Engl.) Swingle & M.Kellerm. – cherry oranges
- Citrus L. – citrus fruits (including Eremocitrus, Microcitrus and Poncirus)
- Clausena Burm.f.
- Feroniella Swingle – may be included in Citrus
- Glycosmis Corrêa
- Limnocitrus Swingle – may be included in Pleiospermium
- Limonia L. – curd fruit
- Luvunga Buch.-Ham. ex Wight & Arn.
- Merope M.Roem.
- Merrillia Swingle
- Micromelum Blume
- Monanthocitrus Tanaka
- Murraya J.Koenig ex L.
- Naringi Adans.
- Pamburus Swingle
- Paramignya Wight
- Pleiospermium Swingle
- Swinglea Merr.
- Triphasia Lour.
- Wenzelia Merr.

Genera that are not listed by Appelhans et al. include:

- Clymenia Swingle – may be included in Citrus

== Bibliography ==
- de Araújo, E. Freitas; de Queiroz, L. Paganucci & Machado, M.A. (2003): What is Citrus? Taxonomic implications from a study of cp-DNA evolution in the tribe Citreae (Rutaceae subfamily Aurantioideae). Organisms Diversity & Evolution 3(1): 55-62. doi:10.1078/1439-6092-00058 (HTML abstract)
