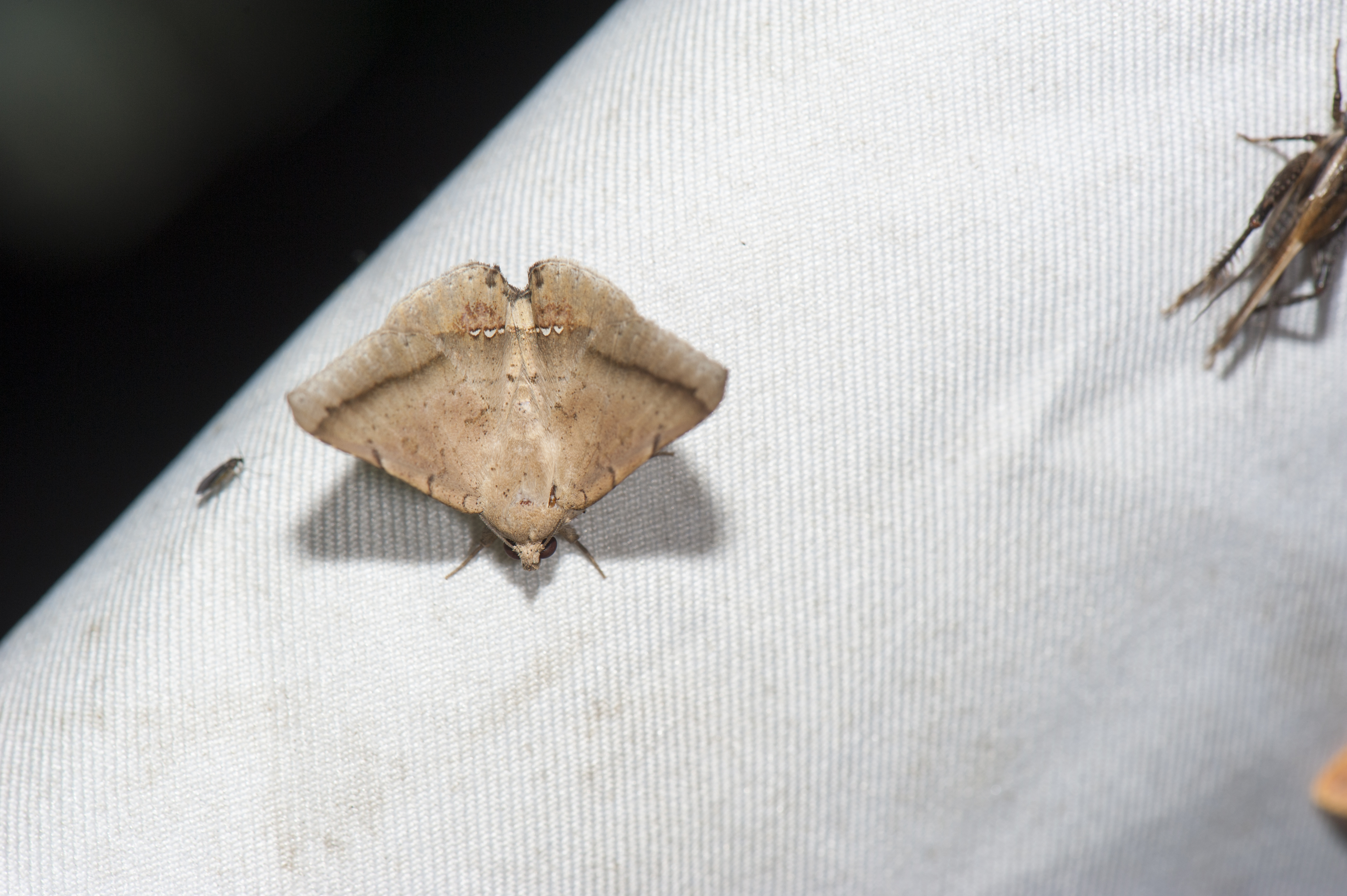

Scientific classification
- Kingdom: Animalia
- Phylum: Arthropoda
- Class: Insecta
- Order: Lepidoptera
- Superfamily: Noctuoidea
- Family: Noctuidae (?)
- Genus: Macaldenia
- Species: M. palumba

Binomial name
- Macaldenia palumba (Guenée, 1852)

Synonyms
- Hulodes palumba Guenée, 1852; Remitiga colligens Walker, 1865; Dysgonia colligens (Walker, 1865); Dysgonia palumba (Guenée, 1852)

= Macaldenia palumba =

Species of moth

Macaldenia palumba is a moth of the family Noctuidae first described by Achille Guenée in 1852. It is found from the Oriental region of India, Sri Lanka to Japan (Okinawa) and Sundaland, east to New Guinea. It is also found on Guam in Micronesia.

== Description ==
Its wingspan is about 38–52 mm. It is generally brownish grey. Forewings slightly suffused with purple and sprinkled with black. Indistinct waved sub-basal and antemedial line present. There is a small fuscous obsolete reniform spot and postmedial line angled below costa. This postmedial line then indistinct and crenulate with a series of black specks on the nervules. A slightly sinuous indistinct or prominent brown sub-marginal line. An almost marginal minute speck series can be seen. Cilia and margin have some grey color. Hindwings with indistinct line and some fuscous postmedial suffusion and a series of small white lunules found with ferrous suffusion beyond them towards inner margin. Some grey on margin and cilia and fuscous marks can be seen towards anal angle.

Larva with first pair of abdominal prolegs aborted and two dorsal humps found on anal somite. Body brownish ochreous above and olive beneath. Some dorsal and lateral black speckled streaks present. A sub-lateral whitish line found with some pinkish spots above it.

The larvae feed on Atalantia and Paramignya. Larvae have been reared on Citrofortunella, but it is unknown if they feed on this plant in the wild.
