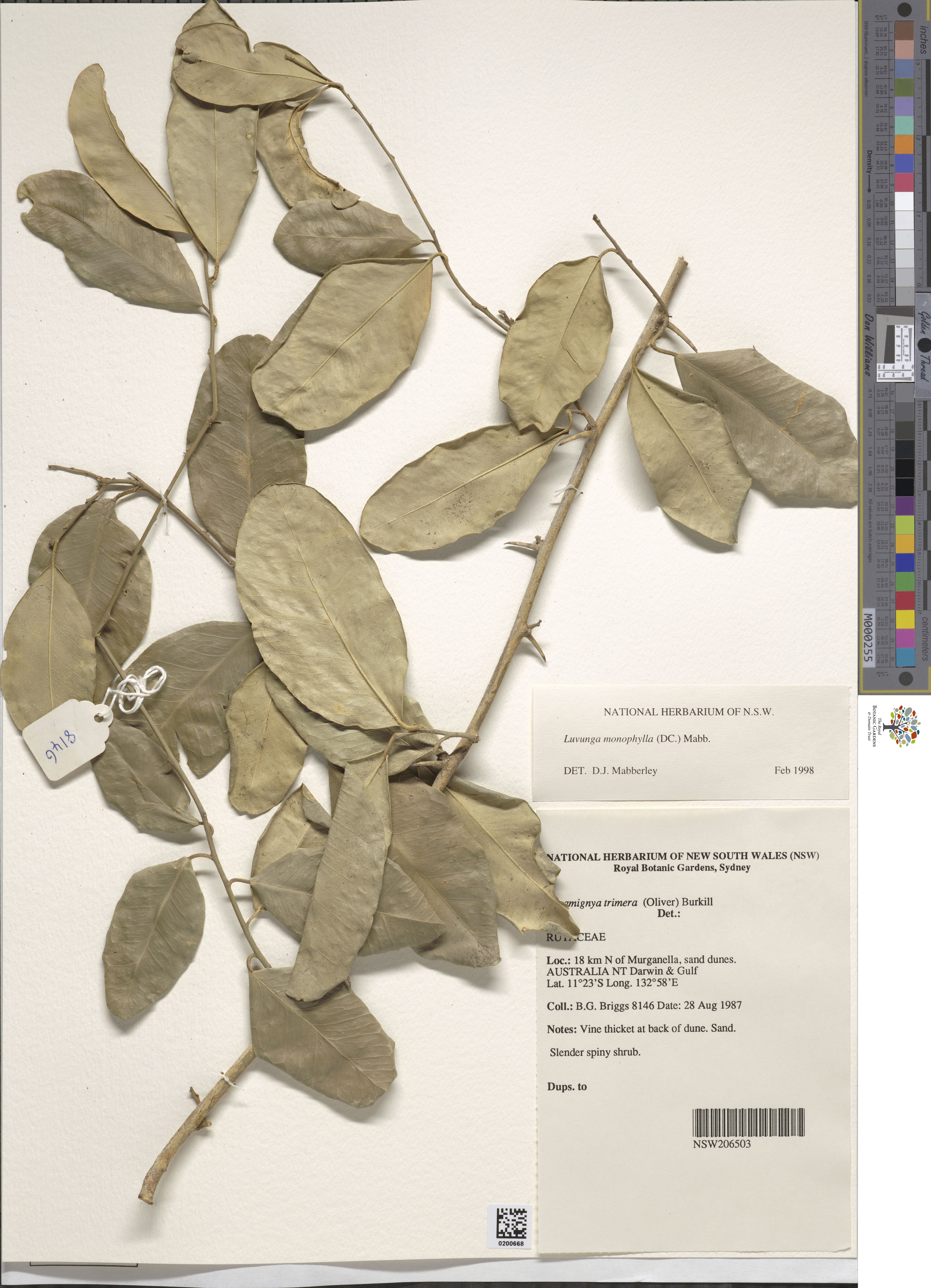
- Herbarium specimen

Conservation status
- Least Concern (NCA)

Scientific classification
- Kingdom: Plantae
- Clade: Tracheophytes
- Clade: Angiosperms
- Clade: Eudicots
- Clade: Rosids
- Order: Sapindales
- Family: Rutaceae
- Genus: Luvunga
- Species: L. monophylla

Binomial name
- Luvunga monophylla (DC.) Mabb.

Synonyms
- Triphasia monophylla DC.; Atalantia recurva Benth.

= Luvunga monophylla =

Species of flowering plant

Luvunga monophylla is a species of plants in the citrus family Rutaceae found in Malesia and northern Australia. It is a scrambling vine or shrub up to a maximum of 3 m (9.8 ft) tall, often with spines in the leaf axils. Leaves are simple (i.e. undivided) and ovate to obovate in shape. They measure up to 8 cm (3.1 in) long and 5 cm (2.0 in) wide and have numerous oil glands. The inflorescences are racemes about half as long as the leaves, and the flowers are sweetly fragrant. The calyx is 3-lobed and there are 3 white or cream petals about 4 mm (0.16 in) long. The fruit is an orange-yellow botanical berry about 1 cm (0.4 in) diameter, containing 2 seeds.

== Distribution and habitat ==
In Australia, this species is recorded from the Kimberley region of Western Australia, the Top End of the Northern Territory, and the island of Iama in the Torres Strait. Outside Australia the plant is known from Indonesia and the Philippines. It grows in monsoon forest and vine thicket at altitudes up to 300 m (980 ft).

== Conservation ==
This species is listed as least concern under the Queensland Government's Nature Conservation Act. As of 30 January 2025, it has not been assessed by the International Union for Conservation of Nature (IUCN).

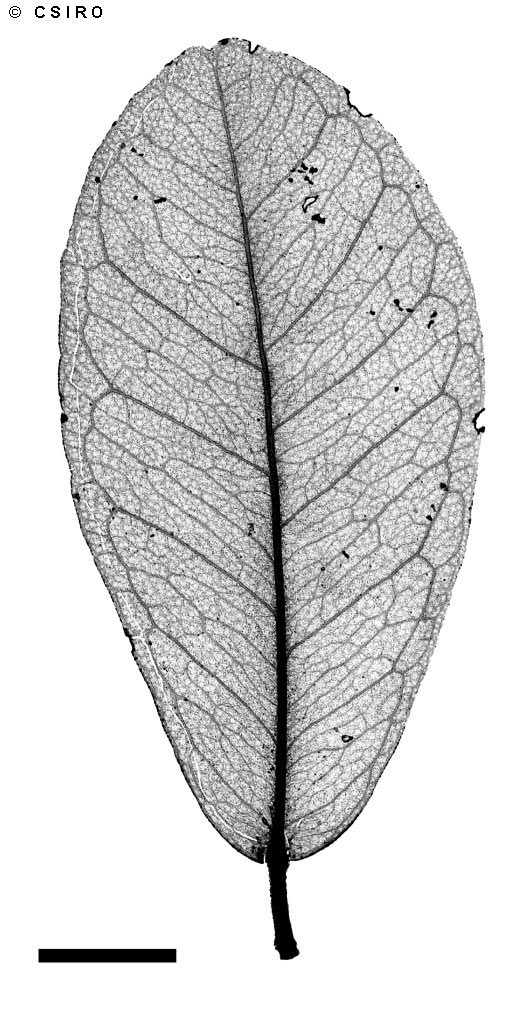
X-ray of leaf

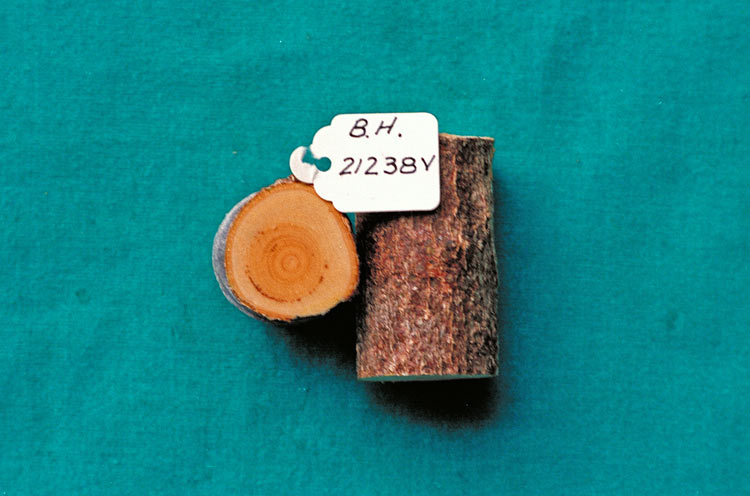
Section of stem
