= Monanthocitrus oblanceolata =

Conservation status
- Vulnerable (IUCN 3.1)

Scientific classification
- Kingdom: Plantae
- Clade: Tracheophytes
- Clade: Angiosperms
- Clade: Eudicots
- Clade: Rosids
- Order: Sapindales
- Family: Rutaceae
- Genus: Monanthocitrus
- Species: M. oblanceolata

Binomial name
- Monanthocitrus oblanceolata Stone & Jones

Species of flowering plant

Monanthocitrus oblanceolata is a species of flowering plant in the citrus family, Rutaceae. It is endemic to Sabah in Malaysia. It was first described in 1988.

Monanthocitrus oblanceolata is a shrub or small understory tree that grows up to 5 meters tall.

It grows in lowland rain forests up to 600 meters elevation, typically on slopes or ridges of low hills, and sometimes along streams or in flat areas. It is an uncommon tree, generally growing as solitary trees or in small populations.
