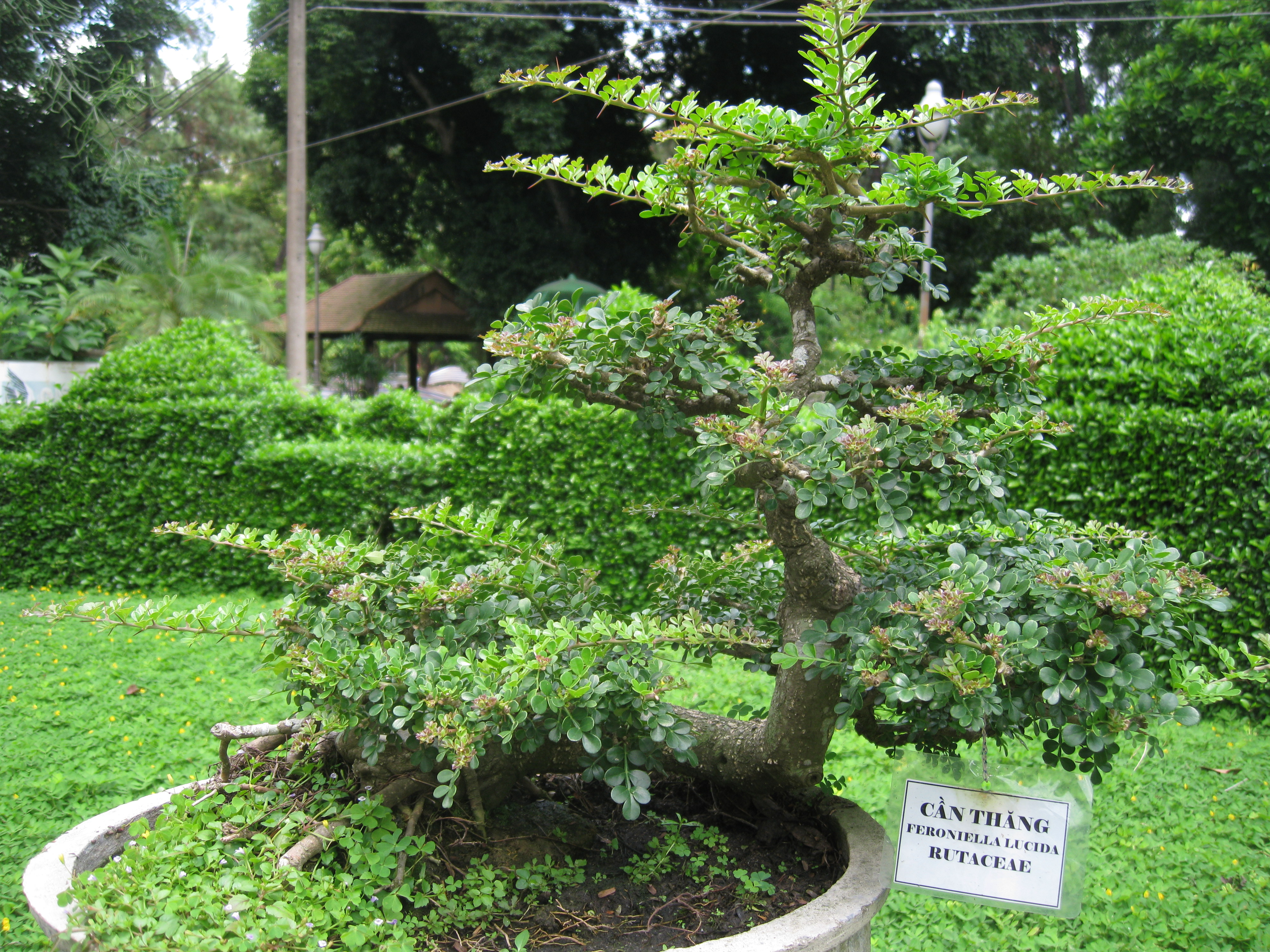

Scientific classification
- Kingdom: Plantae
- Clade: Embryophytes
- Clade: Tracheophytes
- Clade: Spermatophytes
- Clade: Angiosperms
- Clade: Eudicots
- Clade: Rosids
- Order: Sapindales
- Family: Rutaceae
- Subfamily: Aurantioideae
- Genus: Feroniella; Swingle
- Species: F. lucida

Binomial name
- Feroniella lucida (Scheff.) Swingle

Synonyms
- Citrus lucida (Scheff.) Mabb.; Feronia lucida Scheff.; Feroniella oblata Swingle

= Feroniella =

Species of plant

Feroniella is a genus in the family Rutaceae, the only species being Feroniella lucida. The genus is placed within Citrus by some sources, with the species becoming Citrus lucida. Feroniella lucida is a fruit-bearing tree native to Cambodia, Laos, Thailand, Vietnam and the island of Java, Indonesia.

== Description ==
Feroniella lucida is a small to medium-sized tree armed with numerous long, slender, sharp thorns. It grows from 10–15 metres (33–49 ft) tall with a straight bole 20–30 cm (7.9–11.8 in) in diameter. The fruit has a tough green rind with a white and pink pulp containing many yellow crunchy seeds.

== Taxonomy ==
The species was initially treated as a member of the genus Feronia, but was removed to its own genus, Feroniella, by Swingle, who viewed it to be a sister taxon of Limonia in a grouping given the common name of 'wood apples'. He also named Feroniella oblata to distinguish the Cambodian from the Javanese plants, but they came to be viewed as varieties of the same species, Feroniella lucida. Tanaka would name another genus member, Feroniella pubescens, but this is now known to be Harrisonia perforata, leaving F. lucida as the only member of Feroniella. However, based on phylogenetic analysis that surprisingly grouped F. lucida among the citrus, Mabberley suggested it be renamed Citrus lucida. This placement was accepted by Plants of the World Online, as of September 2021, though two recent phylogenetic studies have retained Feroniella as a distinct genus closely related to Limonia rather than uniting it with Citrus.

== Uses ==
In Cambodia and Java, Feroniella lucida is occasionally cultivated as a fruit tree. The pulp of the raw fruits is eaten as a vegetable. The pericarp is used medicinally. The pulp is used as a sour ingredient in Cambodian and Thai cooking.

Feroniella lucida can be grown as an indoor bonsai.

One of the phytochemicals the plant contains is lichexanthone.

== Other names ==
Cambodia: ក្រសាំង (krasang)

Indonesia: kawista-krikil (Java), Kawista batu

Laos: ຫມາກສັງ (mak sang)

Thailand: มะสัง (ma sang), krasang

Vietnam: Cần Thăng (canthan), da da

== Image gallery ==
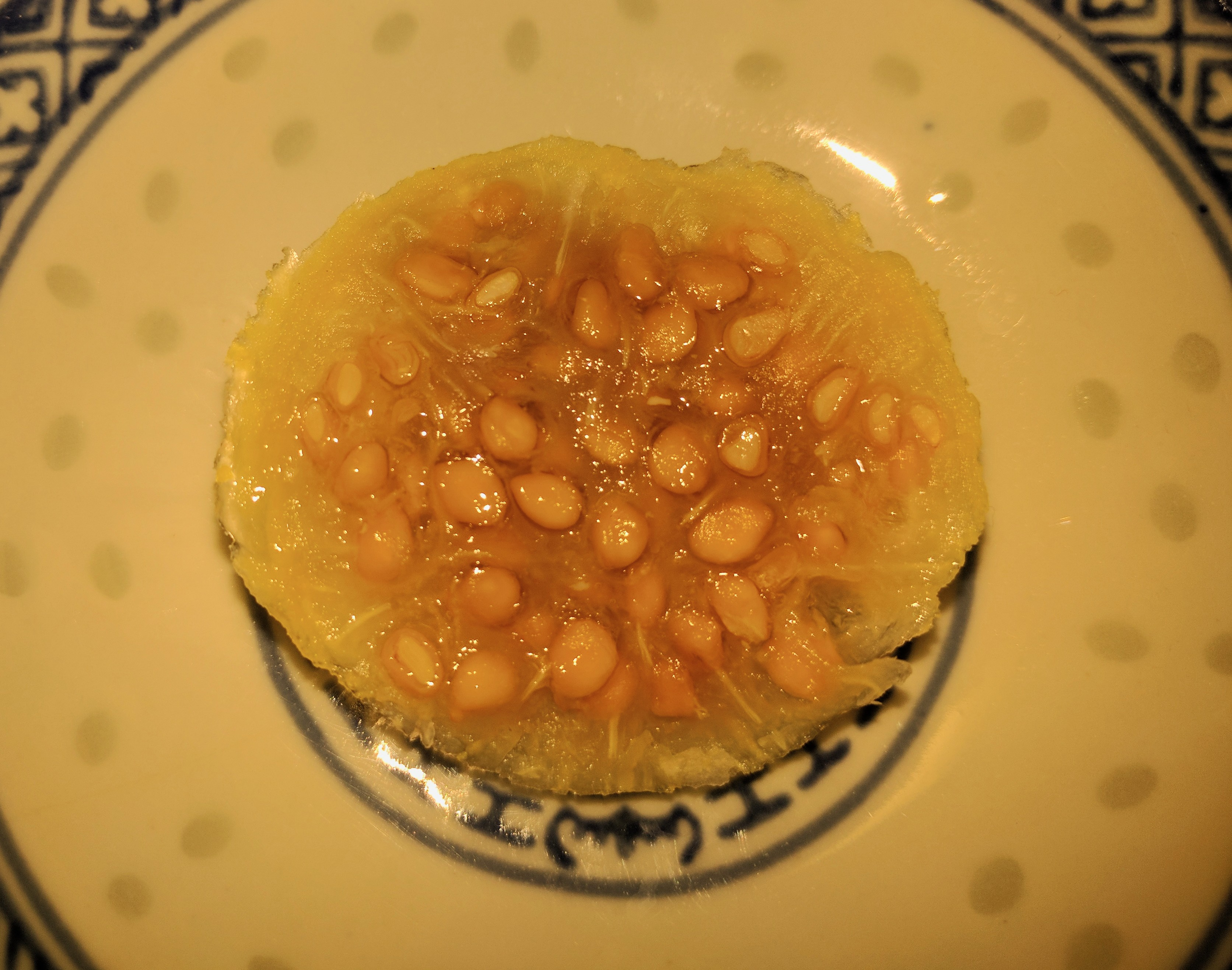
Photo of the pulp of the fruit.

== Bibliography ==
1. Backer, C. A. & R. C. Bakhuizen van den Brink, Jr. 1963–1968. Flora of Java. (F Java)
2. Boutelje, J. B. 1980. Encyclopedia of world timbers, names and technical literature. (Ency WTimber)
3. Swingle, W. T. & P. C. Reece. 1967. The botany of Citrus and its wild relatives. (Bot Citrus)
