= Monanthocitrus =

Scientific classification
- Kingdom: Plantae
- Clade: Tracheophytes
- Clade: Angiosperms
- Clade: Eudicots
- Clade: Rosids
- Order: Sapindales
- Family: Rutaceae
- Subfamily: Aurantioideae
- Genus: Monanthocitrus; Tanaka

Species
- see text

Genus of flowering plants

Monanthocitrus is a genus of flowering plants in the citrus family, Rutaceae. General common names for the genus include spotseed-lime and monanthocitrus.

It is a member of the tribe Citreae in the subfamily Aurantioideae, which includes the genus Citrus. It is one of several genera in the subtribe Triphasiinae, which are known technically as the minor citroid fruit trees.

Most of the species in this small genus have limited native ranges in Southeast Asia.

Species include:

- Monanthocitrus bispinosa
- Monanthocitrus cornuta — endemic to Irian Jaya, Indonesia
- Monanthocitrus oblanceolata — endemic to Sabah, Malaysia
- Monanthocitrus paludosa
