= Pleiospermium latialatum =

Conservation status
- Least Concern (IUCN 3.1)

Scientific classification
- Kingdom: Plantae
- Clade: Tracheophytes
- Clade: Angiosperms
- Clade: Eudicots
- Clade: Rosids
- Order: Sapindales
- Family: Rutaceae
- Genus: Pleiospermium
- Species: P. latialatum

Binomial name
- Pleiospermium latialatum Swingle

Species of flowering plant

Pleiospermium latialatum is a plant in the family Rutaceae. It is native to Borneo.

== Description ==
Pleiospermium latialatum grows as a shrub or tree up to 25 m (80 ft) tall with a trunk diameter of 30 cm (12 in). The leaves are lanceolate to elliptic or oblong and measure up to 15 cm (6 in) long and 7 cm (3 in) wide. The inflorescences are axillary or in panicles. The roundish fruits measure up to 2.5 cm (1 in) in diameter.

== Taxonomy ==
Pleiospermium latialatum was described in 1939 by the American botanist Walter Tennyson Swingle. The type specimen was collected in the Tawau Division of Sabah on Borneo. The specific epithet latialatum means 'broad wing', referring to the leaf stalk (or petiole).

== Distribution and habitat ==
Pleiospermium latialatum is endemic to Borneo, where it occurs widely, except in Brunei. Its habitat is in primary dipterocarp and secondary forests, on hills or by rivers, at lower elevations to 300 m (1,000 ft).

== Conservation ==
Pleiospermium latialatum has been assessed as least concern on the IUCN Red List. The species has a broad distribution in Borneo and is not facing any significant threats.
