= Macaldenia =

Scientific classification
- Domain: Eukaryota
- Kingdom: Animalia
- Phylum: Arthropoda
- Class: Insecta
- Order: Lepidoptera
- Superfamily: Noctuoidea
- Family: Noctuidae (?)
- Subfamily: Catocalinae
- Genus: Macaldenia; Moore, 1885

Synonyms
- Pasipeda Moore, 1882; Parallelura Berio

Genus of moths

Macaldenia is a genus of moths of the family Noctuidae described by Frederic Moore in 1885. It was formerly considered a synonym of Dysgonia.

== Species ==
- Macaldenia palumba (Guenée, 1852)
- Macaldenia palumbioides Hampson
