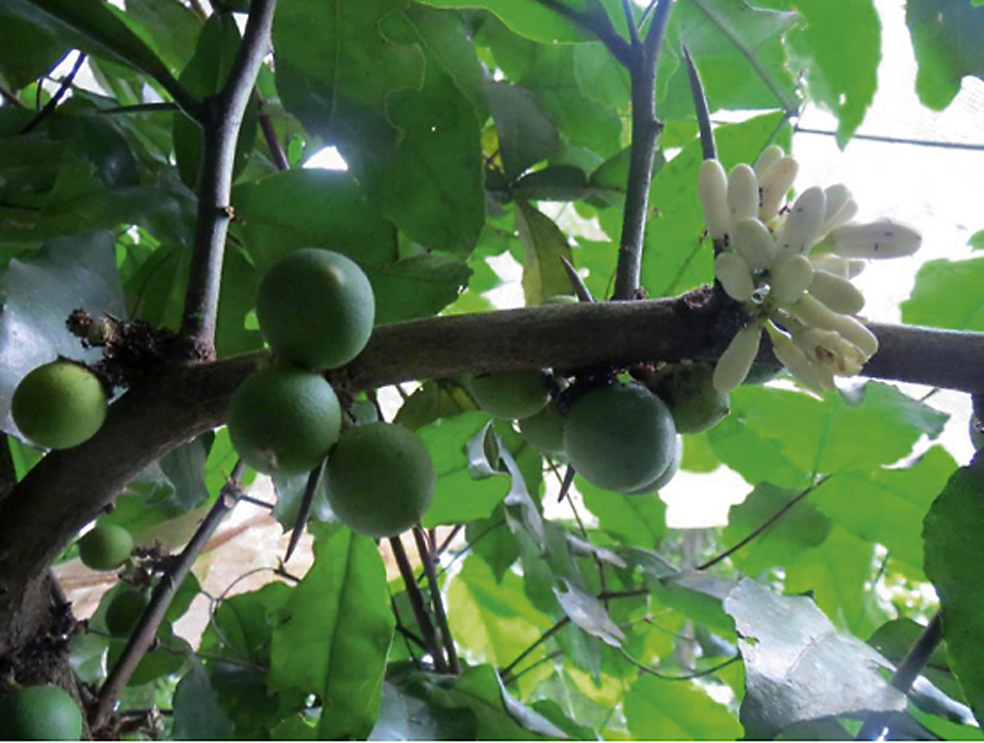

Scientific classification
- Kingdom: Plantae
- Clade: Tracheophytes
- Clade: Angiosperms
- Clade: Eudicots
- Clade: Rosids
- Order: Sapindales
- Family: Rutaceae
- Genus: Citropsis
- Species: C. articulata

Binomial name
- Citropsis articulata (Willd. ex Spreng.) Swingle & M.Kellerm.

Synonyms
- Citropsis schweinfurthii Engl.

= Citropsis articulata =

Species of fruit and plant

Citropsis articulata, known commonly as the African cherry orange, West African cherry orange, Uganda cherry orange, and locally as omuboro, is a species of flowering plant in the citrus family, Rutaceae. It is native to tropical West Africa.

The species is usually a shrub, sometimes a tree. The leaves are up to 33 centimeters long and are made up of pointed leaflets. The inflorescence is a cluster of flowers with four white petals each nearly 2 centimeters long. The style may be 1.5 centimeters long. The fruit is 2 or 3 centimeters long.

In Uganda, an infusion made of the ground root of omuboro, drunk once a day for three days is considered to be a powerful aphrodisiac for men only. Science has not investigated the veracity of this belief. The herbal preparation is sold locally. Conservationists in Uganda are concerned that demand for the plant is such that the species may require conservation efforts.
