= Burkillanthus =

Conservation status
- Least Concern (IUCN 3.1)

Scientific classification
- Kingdom: Plantae
- Clade: Tracheophytes
- Clade: Angiosperms
- Clade: Eudicots
- Clade: Rosids
- Order: Sapindales
- Family: Rutaceae
- Subfamily: Aurantioideae
- Genus: Burkillanthus; Swingle
- Species: B. malaccensis

Binomial name
- Burkillanthus malaccensis (Ridl.) Swingle

Synonyms
- Citrus malaccensis Ridl.

Genus of trees

Burkillanthus is a monotypic genus of flowering plants in the citrus family, Rutaceae, containing the single species Burkillanthus malaccensis. It is native to Sumatra, the Malay Peninsula and Borneo. Its common name is Malay ghostlime.

This species is part of the same subfamily (Aurantioideae), tribe (Citreae), and subtribe (Citrinae), as genus Citrus, and as such, it is known technically as a citrus fruit tree. It grows on river banks and on ridges in primary and secondary forests.
