= Macaldenia palumbioides =

Scientific classification
- Kingdom: Animalia
- Phylum: Arthropoda
- Class: Insecta
- Order: Lepidoptera
- Superfamily: Noctuoidea
- Family: Noctuidae (?)
- Genus: Macaldenia
- Species: M. palumbioides

Binomial name
- Macaldenia palumbioides (Hampson, 1902)

Synonyms
- Parallelia palumbiodes; Macaldenia palumbiodes; Ophiusa palumbioides Hampson, 1902; Parallelia palumbioides (Hampson, 1902)

Species of moth

Macaldenia palumbioides is a moth of the family Noctuidae first described by George Hampson in 1902. It is found in east Africa.
