= Atalantia simplicifolia =

Scientific classification
- Kingdom: Plantae
- Clade: Tracheophytes
- Clade: Angiosperms
- Clade: Eudicots
- Clade: Rosids
- Order: Sapindales
- Family: Rutaceae
- Genus: Atalantia
- Species: A. simplicifolia

Binomial name
- Atalantia simplicifolia (Roxb.) A. DC.

Synonyms
- Amyris simplicifolia Roxb. Atalantia caudata (hooker.); Atalantia roxburghii Oliv

Species of flowering plant

Atalantia simplicifolia is a species of plants in the family Rutaceae. It can be considered as shrub or small tree with average height up to 5 m.

== Description ==
Shrubs or small trees, up to 5 m high; branchlets slender, cylindric, glabrous. Leaves unifoliolate, leaflet 7.5-13.5 x 2.5-5.2 cm, elliptic-lanceolate or elliptic-oblong, shallowly narrowed at base, caudate-acuminate at apex with 10–15 mm long acumen, entire along margins, coriaceous, glabrous, notched at tip; secondary nerves ca 10 pairs with as many fainter ones in between arising at angles 50-600 with the midnerve, finely reticulate; petioles 5–10 mm long, horizontally grooved above, articulate with base of blade, glabrous. Inflorescence axillary racemes, up to 2.5 cm long, few-flowered, glabrous; pedicels slender, ca 7 mm long, glabrous. Flowers small. Calyx small with 4 minute, acute sepals. Petals 4, obovate-oblong. Stamens 8, free; anthers ovoid. Ovary seated on an annular disk, 2-locular; each locule with 2-collateral ovules; stigma subcapitate. Berry globose, glandular, 2-locular, young (unripe) fruits ca 10 x 8 mm.

== Location ==
India: Meghalaya, Mizoram and Nagaland.
