= Pleiospermium longisepalum =

Conservation status
- Least Concern (IUCN 3.1)

Scientific classification
- Kingdom: Plantae
- Clade: Tracheophytes
- Clade: Angiosperms
- Clade: Eudicots
- Clade: Rosids
- Order: Sapindales
- Family: Rutaceae
- Genus: Pleiospermium
- Species: P. longisepalum

Binomial name
- Pleiospermium longisepalum Swingle

Species of plant

Pleiospermium longisepalum (also known as the Banguey Island orangeaster) is a species of plant in the family Rutaceae. It is endemic to the state of Sabah on the island of Borneo.

Pleiospermium longisepalum is a shrub or small tree, growing up to 15 metres tall.

Pleiospermium longisepalum is common in lowland and foothill forests and lower montane forests of Kota Marudu, Ranau, and Tambunan districts, growing up to 1,300 metres elevation. It is also found on some offshore islands like Banggi and Bohayan.

It is typically found on hill slopes and near streams in primary and secondary rain forests. It colonizes quickly into disturbed areas.
