= Balsamocitrus camerunensis =

Conservation status
- Data Deficient (IUCN 2.3)

Scientific classification
- Kingdom: Plantae
- Clade: Tracheophytes
- Clade: Angiosperms
- Clade: Eudicots
- Clade: Rosids
- Order: Sapindales
- Family: Rutaceae
- Genus: Balsamocitrus
- Species: B. camerunensis

Binomial name
- Balsamocitrus camerunensis Letouzey

Species of flowering plant

Balsamocitrus camerunensis is a species of plant in the family Rutaceae. It is found in Cameroon and Central African Republic.
