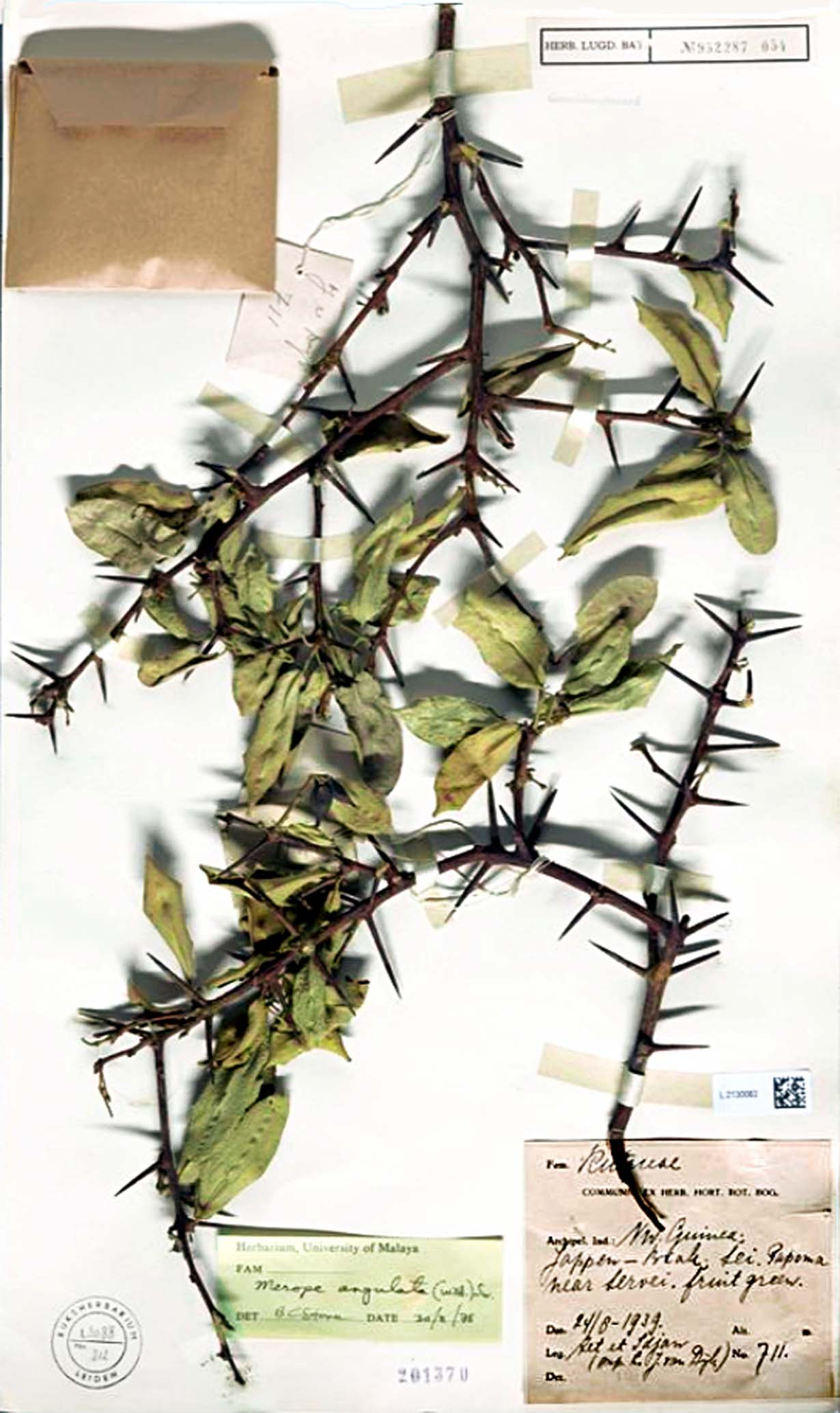

Conservation status
- Least Concern (IUCN 3.1)

Scientific classification
- Kingdom: Plantae
- Clade: Tracheophytes
- Clade: Angiosperms
- Clade: Eudicots
- Clade: Rosids
- Order: Sapindales
- Family: Rutaceae
- Subfamily: Aurantioideae
- Tribe: Citreae
- Genus: Merope; M.Roem. (1846)
- Species: M. angulata

Binomial name
- Merope angulata (Willd.) Swingle (1915)

Synonyms
- Atalantia angulata (Willd.) Engl. (1931); Atalantia longispina Kurz (1872); Atalantia spinosa (Blume) Hook. ex Koord. (1912); Citrus angulata Willd. (1802); Glycosmis spinosa (Blume) D.Dietr. (1840); Gonocitrus angulatus (Willd.) Kurz (1873); Limonia angulata (Willd.) Wight & Arn. ex Voigt (1845); Merope spinosa (Blume) M.Roem. (1846); Paramignya angulata Kurz (1875); Paramignya longispina Hook.f. (1875); Sclerostylis spinosa Blume (1825)

= Merope angulata =

Species of plant

Merope angulata is a species of flowering plant in the family Rutaceae. It is a tree that ranges from northeastern India through Bangladesh, Myanmar, the Andaman and Nicobar islands, Peninsular Malaysia, Borneo, Java, Sulawesi, the Philippines, and Maluku Islands to New Guinea. It is the sole species in genus Merope.

It is an erect shrub growing up to 3 meters tall, with sparse stems growing from a root crown. Stout spines 1.5 – 3.5 cm long grow on the axils of juvenile stems. Leaves are oval, alternate, thick, and leathery, measuring 4.5 – 16 by 2 – 7 cm. The leaves are oval with blunt or slightly pointed tips and slightly notched leaf edges. They are aromatic with a lime-like scent when bruised. Flowers are white, fragrant, solitary, and bisexual, about 2 cm long, and grow in leaf axils in pairs or small clusters.

The plant is salt-tolerant and grows in coastal mangrove swamps, tidal forests, and brackish wetlands.

The species is threatened with habitat loss from destruction of its native habitat for agriculture, aquaculture, coastal development, and tourism. Its natural regeneration is limited by sparse seed production and poor seedling establishment. The IUCN Red List assesses the species' conservation status as least-concern across its range. It is assessed as critically endangered in Singapore, endangered in Peninsular Malaysia, and rare and threatened in India. Indian populations of the species are limited to the Jharkhali islands of the Sunderbans in West Bengal, and to the Bhitarkanika Mangroves and Mahanadi River Delta in Orissa.
