= Paramignya citrifolia =

- Paramignya citrifolia in Bangladesh

Scientific classification
- Kingdom: Plantae
- Clade: Tracheophytes
- Clade: Angiosperms
- Clade: Eudicots
- Clade: Rosids
- Order: Sapindales
- Family: Rutaceae
- Genus: Paramignya
- Species: P. citrifolia

Binomial name
- Paramignya citrifolia Oliv.

Synonyms
- Atalantia citrifolia (Oliv.) Kurz; Limonia citrifolia Roxb.; Paramignya micrantha Kurz

Species of shrub

Paramignya citrifolia is a sweet-scented species of flowering plant. It is a spiny scandent shrub.

== Distribution ==
Paramignya citrifolia is native to Tropical Asia in Bangladesh, Thailand and Myanmar in evergreen forest and hill streams. It is found in the forests of Bandarban, Chattogram, Cox's Bazar, Khagrachari and Rangamati districts.
