= Luvunga =

Scientific classification
- Kingdom: Plantae
- Clade: Tracheophytes
- Clade: Angiosperms
- Clade: Eudicots
- Clade: Rosids
- Order: Sapindales
- Family: Rutaceae
- Subfamily: Aurantioideae
- Genus: Luvunga; Buch.-Ham. ex Wight & Arn.

Genus of flowering plants

Luvunga is an Asian genus of plants in the family Rutaceae: tribe Citreae. It is distributed from India to China, and through Southeast Asia to northern Australia.

== Species ==
As of January 2025, Plants of the World Online (POWO) accepts the following 11 species:

- Luvunga angustifolia (Oliv.) Tanaka
- Luvunga borneensis Hochr.
- Luvunga eleutherandra Dalzell
- Luvunga hongiaoensis Tagane
- Luvunga minutiflora B.C.Stone
- Luvunga monophylla (DC.) Mabb.
- Luvunga papuana Lauterb.
- Luvunga philippinensis Merr.
- Luvunga sarmentosa (Blume) Kurz
- Luvunga scandens (Roxb.) Buch.-Ham. ex Wight
- Luvunga subanenianae Mazo & Tahil

In addition, the name Luvunga crassifolia is accepted by the Catalogue of Life (COL) but not by POWO. The two authorities also disagree on the author of the name, with COL claiming it was Yuichiro Tanaka and POWO claiming it was Tyôzaburô Tanaka.
