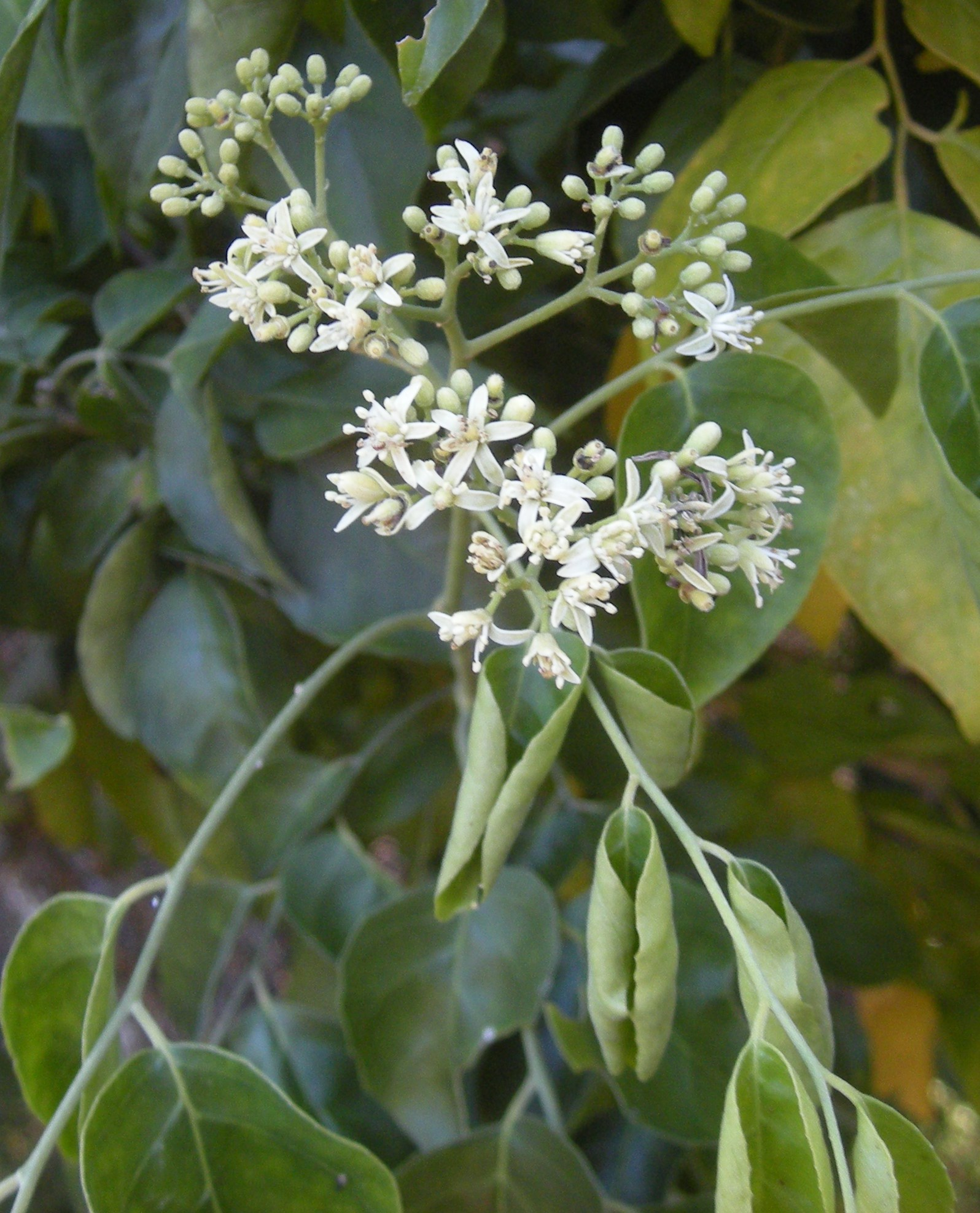
- Micromelum minutum

Scientific classification
- Kingdom: Plantae
- Clade: Tracheophytes
- Clade: Angiosperms
- Clade: Eudicots
- Clade: Rosids
- Order: Sapindales
- Family: Rutaceae
- Subfamily: Aurantioideae
- Genus: Micromelum; Blume

Species
- See text

Synonyms
- Aulacia Lour.

= Micromelum =

Genus of flowering plants

Micromelum is a genus of eight species of flowering plants in the family Rutaceae.

== Description ==
The genus includes evergreen and deciduous shrubs and trees. The leaves are glandular and aromatic, containing essential oils. They are alternately arranged. They are usually pinnate, divided into up to 23 leaflets, except for M. diversifolium, which sometimes has undivided leaf blades. The leaflet edges are smooth or toothed. There are sometimes glandular stipules. The inflorescence is a large panicle, sometimes flat-topped like a corymb, growing from the leaf axils or at the ends of branches. The flowers have five narrow petals in shades of green, white, or yellow, borne in a hairy, cup-like calyx with five lobes or five separate sepals. The odour of the flowers has been described as "malodorous" and "foetid". There are ten stamens and one to five styles. The genus is noted for the unusual curving or twisting of the chambers in the ovary. The fruit is a berry up to 1 cm (0.4 in) long. It is yellow, orange, or red, and sometimes fleshy, but it lacks the pulp present in some related fruits, notably citrus. The peel is gland-dotted. Each fruit has one to three seeds.

The plants vary in form, with M.. hirsutum being a low shrub sometimes less than 1 m (3 ft 3 in) tall and M. integerrimum being a tree which can exceed 9 m (30 ft) in height.

== Taxonomy ==
The genus Micromelum was first formally described in 1825 by Carl Ludwig Blume in Bijdragen tot de Flora van Nederlandsch Indie and the first species described was Micromelum pubescens, now regarded as a synonym of Micromelum minutum.

There are several subfamilies in the citrus family, with genus Citrus classified in the Aurantioideae. Micromelum belongs to the other tribe in this subfamily, Clauseneae. It is the only genus of the subtribe Micromelinae that are known technically as the "very remote citroid fruit trees".

Micromelum includes eight species distributed in Asia, Australia, and the Pacific Islands.

=== Species list ===
The following is a list of species and varieties accepted at the Plants of the World Online as at July 2020:

- Micromelum compressum Blanco – Vietnam
- Micromelum coriaceum Seem. – New Caledonia
- Micromelum diversifolium Miq.
- Micromelum glanduliferum B.Hansen – Laos, Thailand
- Micromelum hirsutum Oliv. – Bangladesh, Laos, Malaya, Myanmar, Vietnam
- Micromelum integerrimum (Roxb. ex DC.) Wight & Arn. ex M.Roem. – Andaman Is., Cambodia, China South-Central, China Southeast, East Himalaya, Hainan, Laos, Myanmar, Nepal, Philippines, Thailand, Tibet, Vietnam
- Micromelum minutum (G.Forst.) Wight & Arn. – Assam, Bangladesh, Cambodia, China South-Central, China Southeast, Fiji, Hainan, Laos, Lesser Sunda Is., Malaya, Myanmar, New Caledonia, Niue, Samoa, Solomon Is., Thailand, Tonga, Vanuatu, Vietnam, Wallis-Futuna Is., Australia
  - Micromelum minutum var. ceylanicum B.C.Stone – Sri Lanka
- Micromelum scandens Rech. – Bismarck Archipelago

== Chemistry ==
M. minutum is used as a traditional medicine in Fiji, and in Malaysia it is used to treat fever and ringworm. M. integerrimum has been used in China to treat dysentery and arthritis.

The chemistry of these plants has been studied, with several known and new coumarins isolated. One such coumarin from M. integerrimum, micromelin, appears to have anticancer properties.
