= Balsamocitrus =

Scientific classification
- Kingdom: Plantae
- Clade: Tracheophytes
- Clade: Angiosperms
- Clade: Eudicots
- Clade: Rosids
- Order: Sapindales
- Family: Rutaceae
- Subfamily: Aurantioideae
- Genus: Balsamocitrus; Stapf

Genus of flowering plants

Balsamocitrus is a genus of plant in family Rutaceae. It is native to Cameroon, Central African Republic, Gabon, Guinea, Republic of the Congo, and Uganda.

Species include:

- Balsamocitrus camerunensis Letouzey
- Balsamocitrus dawei Stapf
- Balsamocitrus gabonensis L.D.Swingle
