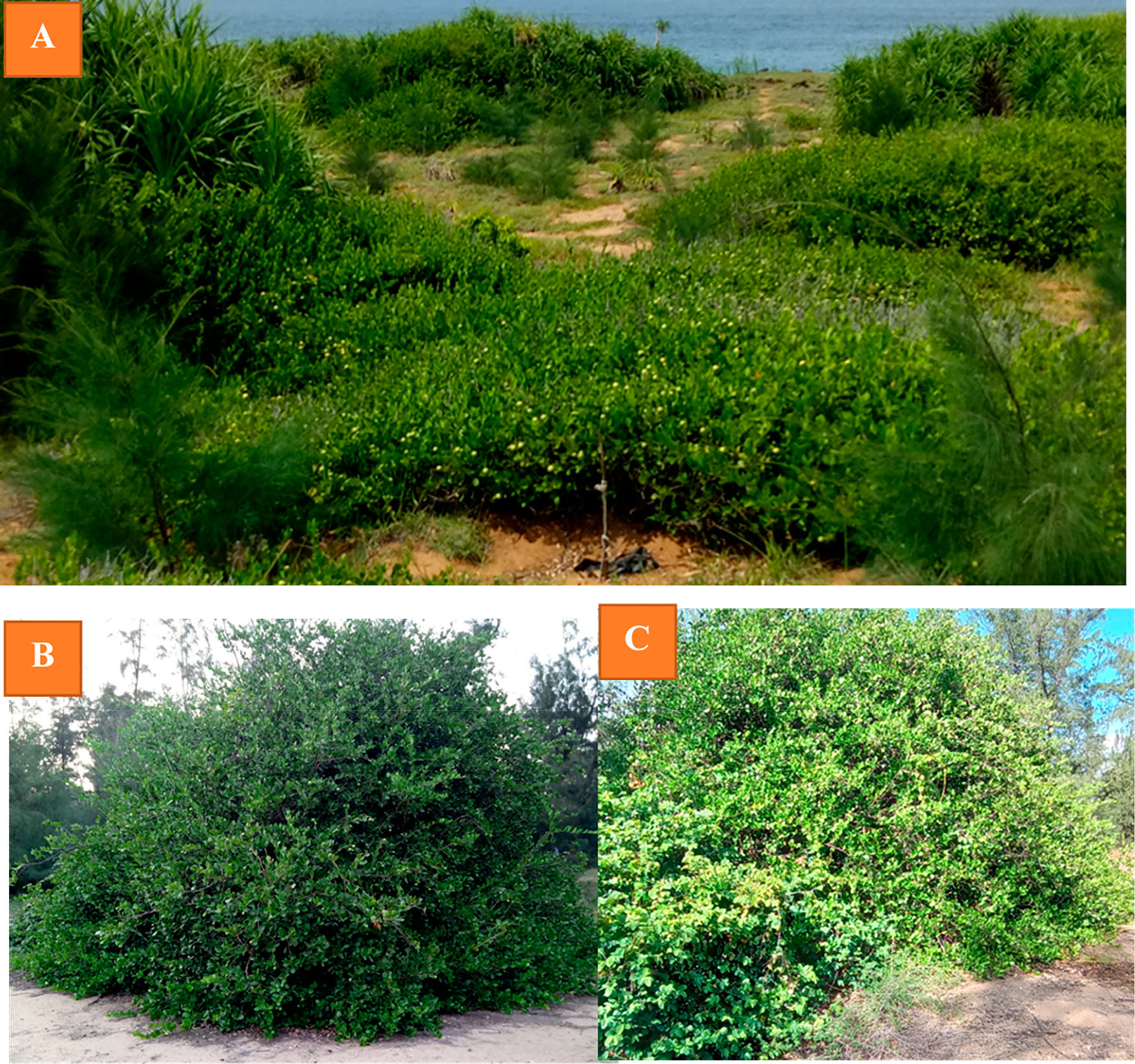
- Habit

Conservation status
- Endangered (IUCN 3.1)

Scientific classification
- Kingdom: Plantae
- Clade: Tracheophytes
- Clade: Angiosperms
- Clade: Eudicots
- Clade: Rosids
- Order: Sapindales
- Family: Rutaceae
- Genus: Pleiospermium
- Species: P. littorale

Binomial name
- Pleiospermium littorale (Miq.) Tanaka

Synonyms
- Atalantia littoralis (Miq.) Guillaumin; Limnocitrus littoralis (Miq.) Swingle; Limonia littoralis (Miq.) Backer; Paramignya littoralis Miq.

= Pleiospermium littorale =

Species of flowering plant

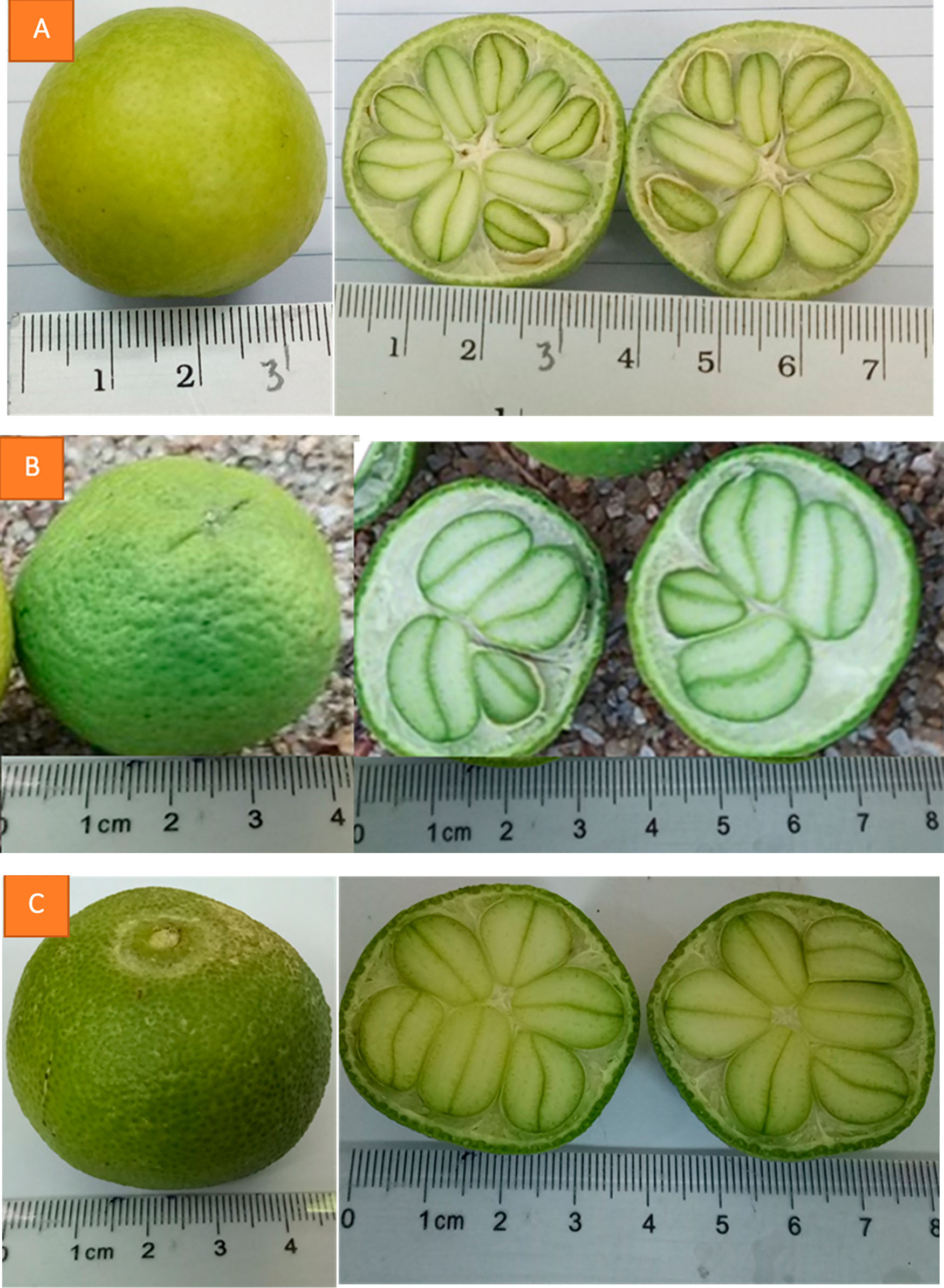
Fruit, halved

Pleiospermium littorale is a plant in the citrus family Rutaceae native to southeast Vietnam and the island of Java in Indonesia, where it inhabits coastal areas and plays a role in erosion prevention. In traditional Vietnamese medicine different parts of the plant have been used as an expectorant, cough suppressant, for exudation, and the treatment of colds and fevers.

It is an endangered species threatened by habitat loss.
