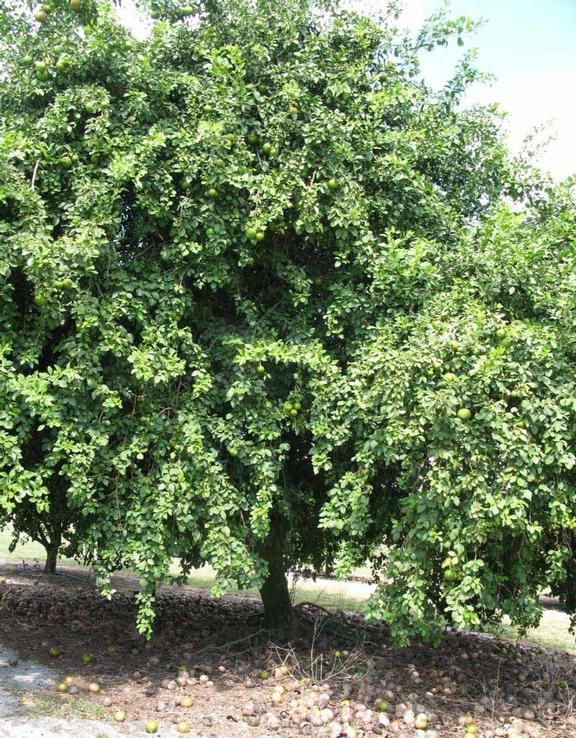
- Afraegle paniculata

Scientific classification
- Kingdom: Plantae
- Clade: Tracheophytes
- Clade: Angiosperms
- Clade: Eudicots
- Clade: Rosids
- Order: Sapindales
- Family: Rutaceae
- Subfamily: Aurantioideae
- Genus: Afraegle; Engl.

= Afraegle =

Genus of plants

Afraegle is a genus of flowering plants belonging to the family Rutaceae.

Its native range is Western and Western Central Tropical Africa.

Species:

- Afraegle mildbraedii Engl.
- Afraegle paniculata (Schumach. & Thonn.) Engl.
