= Aeglopsis =

- Aeglopsis chevalieri

Scientific classification
- Kingdom: Plantae
- Clade: Tracheophytes
- Clade: Angiosperms
- Clade: Eudicots
- Clade: Rosids
- Order: Sapindales
- Family: Rutaceae
- Subfamily: Aurantioideae
- Genus: Aeglopsis; Swingle

Genus of plants

Aeglopsis is a genus of flowering plants belonging to the family Rutaceae.

Its native range is Tropical Africa.

Species:

- Aeglopsis beguei A.Chev.
- Aeglopsis chevalieri Swingle
- Aeglopsis eggelingii M.Taylor
- Aeglopsis mangenotii A.Chev.
