= Wenzelia =

Scientific classification
- Kingdom: Plantae
- Clade: Tracheophytes
- Clade: Angiosperms
- Clade: Eudicots
- Clade: Rosids
- Order: Sapindales
- Family: Rutaceae
- Subfamily: Aurantioideae
- Genus: Wenzelia; Merr.

Genus of flowering plants

Wenzelia is a genus of flowering plants belonging to the family Rutaceae.

It is native to the Philippines, New Guinea, the Solomon Islands, and Fiji.

== Known species ==
As accepted by Plants of the World Online:

- Wenzelia archboldiana Swingle
- Wenzelia brevipes Merr.
- Wenzelia dolichophylla (K.Schum. & Lauterb.) Tanaka
- Wenzelia grandiflora (Lauterb.) Swingle
- Wenzelia kambarae Swingle
- Wenzelia melanesica Swingle
- Wenzelia platysperma Swingle
- Wenzelia tenuifolia Swingle

== Taxonomy ==
The genus name of Wenzelia is in honour of Chester A. Wenzel (1882–1929), an American teacher, cattle rancher and plant collector in the Philippines. It was first described and published in Philipp. J. Sci., Section C, Vol.10 on page 272 in 1915.
