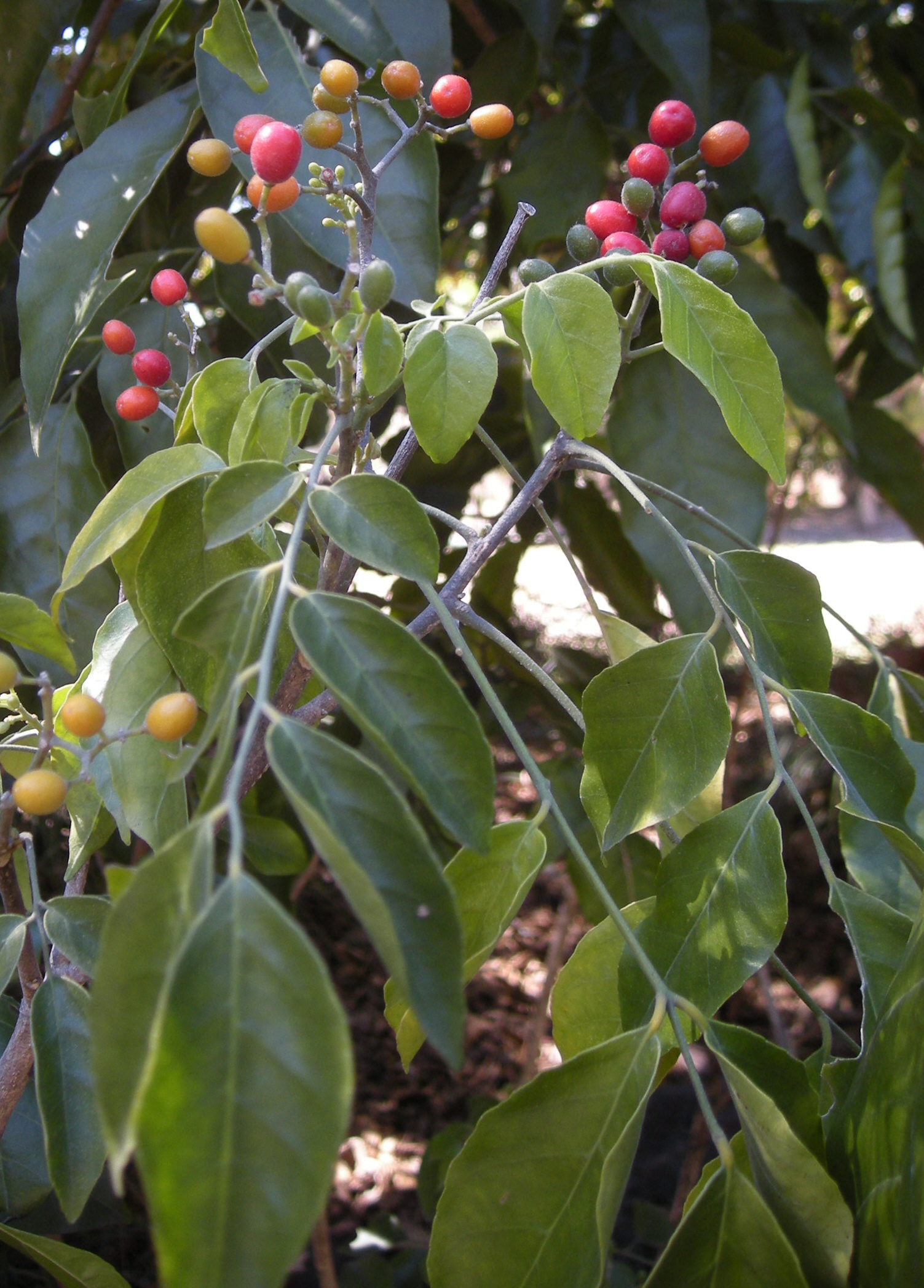
- Micromelum minutum fruit and foliage

Conservation status
- Least Concern (IUCN 3.1)

Scientific classification
- Kingdom: Plantae
- Clade: Tracheophytes
- Clade: Angiosperms
- Clade: Eudicots
- Clade: Rosids
- Order: Sapindales
- Family: Rutaceae
- Genus: Micromelum
- Species: M. minutum

Binomial name
- Micromelum minutum (G.Forst.) Wight & Arn.

Synonyms
- List: Glycosmis subvelutina F.Muell.; Limonia minuta G.Forst.; Micromelum glabrescens Benth.; Micromelum minutum var. glabrescens (Benth.) Hochr.; Micromelum minutum (G.Forst.) Wight & Arn. var. minutum; Micromelum pubescens Blume; Micromelum pubescens var. glabrescens (Benth.) Oliv.; Micromelum pubescens Blume var. pubescens

= Micromelum minutum =

Limeberry

Species of flowering plant

Micromelum minutum, commonly known as limeberry, dilminyin (east Arnhem Land). kimiar margibur (Murray Island), tulibas tilos (Philippines), sesi (Indonesia) and samui (Thailand), is a species of small tree or shrub in the citrus plant family Rutaceae. It occurs from India and Indochina to Australia. It has pinnate leaves with egg-shaped to lance-shaped leaflets, hairy, pale green or creamish, scented flowers arranged in large groups and yellow to orange or red, oval to spherical berries in dense clusters.

== Description ==
Micromelum minutum is a tree that typically grows to a height of 10–20 m (33–66 ft) but also flowers and forms fruit as a dense shrub. The leaves are up to 300 mm (12 in) long and pinnate with seven to fifteen egg-shaped to lance-shaped leaflets 30–120 mm (1.2–4.7 in) long and 15–60 mm (0.59–2.36 in) wide on a petiolule up to 5 mm (0.20 in) long. The flowers are borne in large, hairy, scented groups 130–200 mm (5.1–7.9 in) long, each flower on a pedicel up to 5 mm (0.20 in) long. The petals are pale green or creamish, 5–8 mm (0.20–0.31 in) long and there are ten stamens that alternate in length. Flowering occurs all year and the fruit a yellow to orange or red, oval to spherical berry about 10 mm (0.39 in) long.

== Taxonomy ==
Limeberry was first formally described in 1786 by Georg Forster who gave it the name Limonia minuta and published the description in Florulae Insularum Australium Prodromus. In 1834, Wight and George Arnott Walker-Arnott changed the name to Micromelum minutum in their book Prodromus Florae Peninsulae Indiae Orientalis.

== Distribution and habitat ==
Micromelum minutum grows as an understorey plant in rainforest, including dry rainforest and monsoon forest and from sea level to an altitude of 600 m (2,000 ft). It also occurs in sandstone gorges and on karst formations far inland. The species occurs in Malesia, New Caledonia, Fiji and northern Australia. In Australia it is found in the Kimberley region of Western Australia, in the northern part of the Northern Territory, and south from the Cape York Peninsula in Queensland. It was recorded in New South Wales prior to 1911.

== Ecology ==
The larvae of some species of butterfly, including the orchard butterfly (Papilio aegeus) and canopus butterfly (Papilio fuscus) use this species as a food source.

== Uses ==
In Malesia and Indonesia, limeberry is used as medicine and the timber is used for construction.
