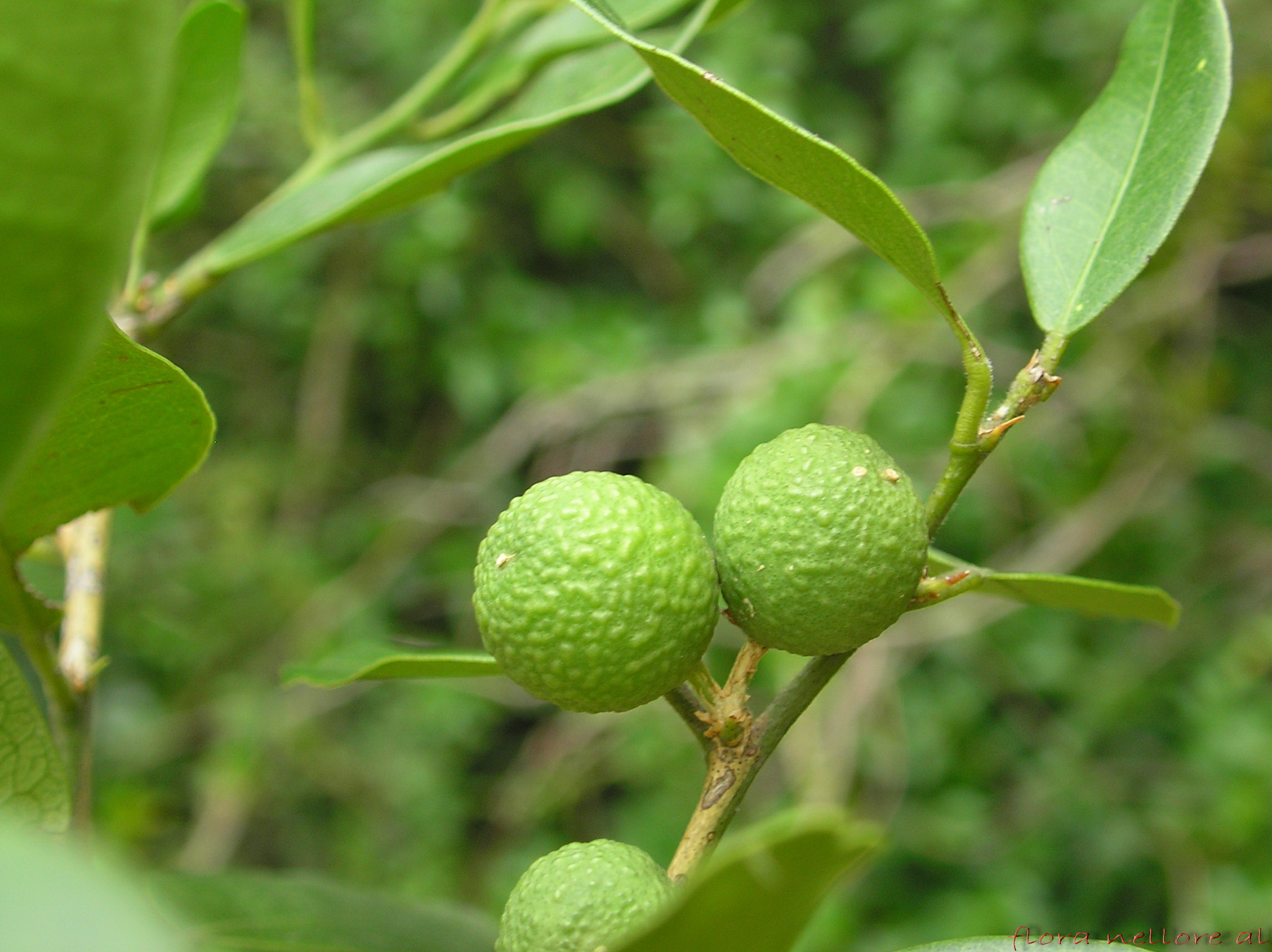
- Atalantia monophylla

Scientific classification
- Kingdom: Plantae
- Clade: Tracheophytes
- Clade: Angiosperms
- Clade: Eudicots
- Clade: Rosids
- Order: Sapindales
- Family: Rutaceae
- Subfamily: Aurantioideae
- Genus: Atalantia; Corrêa, nom. cons.

Type species
- Atalantia monophylla DC.

Species
- See text.

Synonyms
- Dumula Lour. ex Gomes; Gonocitrus Kurz; Helie M.Roem.; Malnaregam Adans.; Malnerega Raf.; Phantis L. ex Adans.; Rissoa Arn.; Sclerostylis Blume; Severinia Ten.

= Atalantia =

Genus of flowering plants

Atalantia is a genus of flowering plants in the citrus family, the Rutaceae.

== Taxonomy ==
The genus is placed in the subfamily Aurantioideae, which also includes the genus Citrus. It has been placed in the tribe Aurantieae and subtribe Citrinae, which are known as the citrus fruit trees. Atalantia and the genus Citropsis are also called near-citrus fruit trees.

=== Species ===
As of October 2024, Plants of the World Online accepted the following species:

- Atalantia acuminata C.C.Huang
- Atalantia buxifolia (Poir.) Oliv. ex Benth.
- Atalantia ceylanica (Arn.) Oliv.
- Atalantia citroides Pierre ex Guillaumin
- Atalantia dasycarpa C.C.Huang
- Atalantia fongkaica C.C.Huang
- Atalantia guillauminii Swingle
- Atalantia henryi (Swingle) C.C.Huang
- Atalantia kwangtungensis Merr.
- Atalantia lauterbachii (Swingle) Govaerts
- Atalantia linearis (Blanco) Merr.
- Atalantia macrophylla (Oliv.) Kurz
- Atalantia monophylla DC.
- Atalantia paniculata Warb.
- Atalantia racemosa Wight ex Hook.
- Atalantia retusa Merr.
- Atalantia rotundifolia (Thwaites) Yu.Tanaka
- Atalantia roxburghiana Hook.f.
- Atalantia sessiliflora Guillaumin
- Atalantia simplicifolia (Roxb.) Engl.
- Atalantia wightii Yu.Tanaka

== Ecology ==
Papilio polymnestor, the blue Mormon, a large swallowtail butterfly from South India and Sri Lanka can be found near Atalantia. Phyllocnistis citrella, the citrus leafminer, is a moth of the family Gracillariidae whose larvae are considered a serious agricultural pest on citrus species, such as Atalantia. Macaldenia palumba is a moth of the family Noctuidae whose larvae feed on Atalantia.

== See also ==
- List of Rutaceae genera
