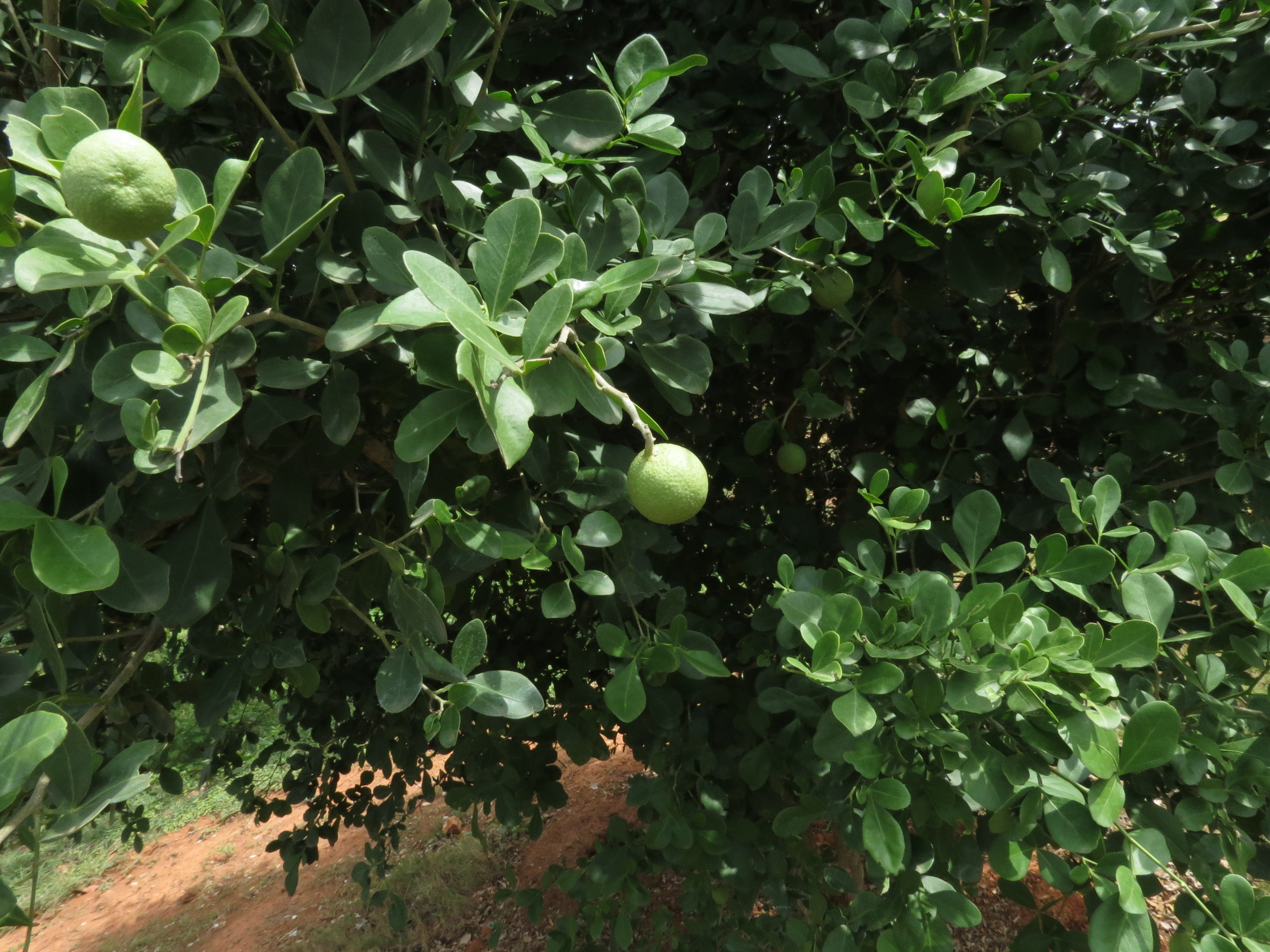
- Pleiospermium alatum

Scientific classification
- Kingdom: Plantae
- Clade: Tracheophytes
- Clade: Angiosperms
- Clade: Eudicots
- Clade: Rosids
- Order: Sapindales
- Family: Rutaceae
- Subfamily: Aurantioideae
- Genus: Pleiospermium (Engl.) Swingle

Species
- See text.

= Pleiospermium =

Genus of plants

Pleiospermium is a genus of plants in the family Rutaceae.

== Species ==
As of September 2021, Plants of the World Online accepted the following species:

- Pleiospermium alatum (Wall. ex Wight & Arn.) Swingle
- Pleiospermium annamense Guillaumin
- Pleiospermium dubium (Blume) Swingle
- Pleiospermium latialatum Swingle
- Pleiospermium littorale (Miq.) Tanaka
- Pleiospermium longisepalum Swingle
- Pleiospermium sumatranum Swingle
