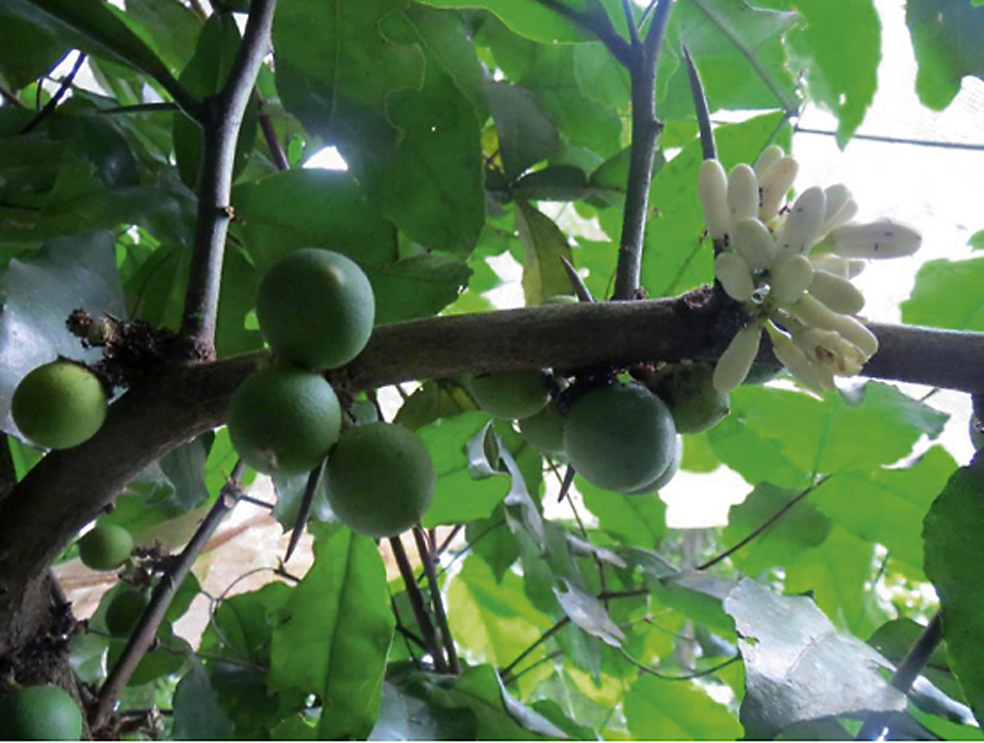
- Citropsis articulata

Scientific classification
- Kingdom: Plantae
- Clade: Tracheophytes
- Clade: Angiosperms
- Clade: Eudicots
- Clade: Rosids
- Order: Sapindales
- Family: Rutaceae
- Subfamily: Aurantioideae
- Genus: Citropsis (Engl.) Swingle & Kellerm.

Species
- See text

= Citropsis =

Genus of flowering plants

Citropsis is a genus of flowering plants in the citrus family, Rutaceae. They are known generally as African cherry oranges. They are native to Africa.

This genus is in the subfamily Aurantioideae, which also includes genus Citrus. It is in the tribe Citreae and subtribe Citrinae, which are known technically as the citrus fruit trees. Citropsis and the genus Atalantia are also called near-citrus fruit trees. The genus Citropsis is thought to be an ancestral group of genus Citrus. Fruit-bearing intergeneric hybrids have been established between Citropsis gabunensis and Citrus wakonai. Demand for the roots, supposedly an aphrodisiac, may lead to the overexploitation of the tree.

Taxa include:

- Citropsis angolensis – Angola cherry orange
- Citropsis articulata (syn. C. preussii, C. schweinfurthii) – West African cherry orange
- Citropsis daweana – Mozambique cherry orange
- Citropsis gabunensis – Gabon cherry orange
  - Citropsis gabunensis var. lacourtiana – Sankuru cherry orange
- Citropsis gilletiana – Gillet's cherry orange
- Citropsis latialata – Ikongu cherry orange
- Citropsis le-testui – Le Testu's cherry orange
- Citropsis mirabilis – Ivory Coast cherry orange
- Citropsis noldeae
- Citropsis tanakae – Sierra Leone cherry orange
- Citropsis zenkeri – Zenker's cherry orange
