= Pamburus =

Scientific classification
- Kingdom: Plantae
- Clade: Tracheophytes
- Clade: Angiosperms
- Clade: Eudicots
- Clade: Rosids
- Order: Sapindales
- Family: Rutaceae
- Subfamily: Aurantioideae
- Genus: Pamburus; Swingle

Genus of plants

Pamburus is a genus of flowering plants belonging to the family Rutaceae.

Its native range is India and Sri Lanka.

== Species ==
Species:

- Pamburus missionis (Wall. ex Wight) Swingle
