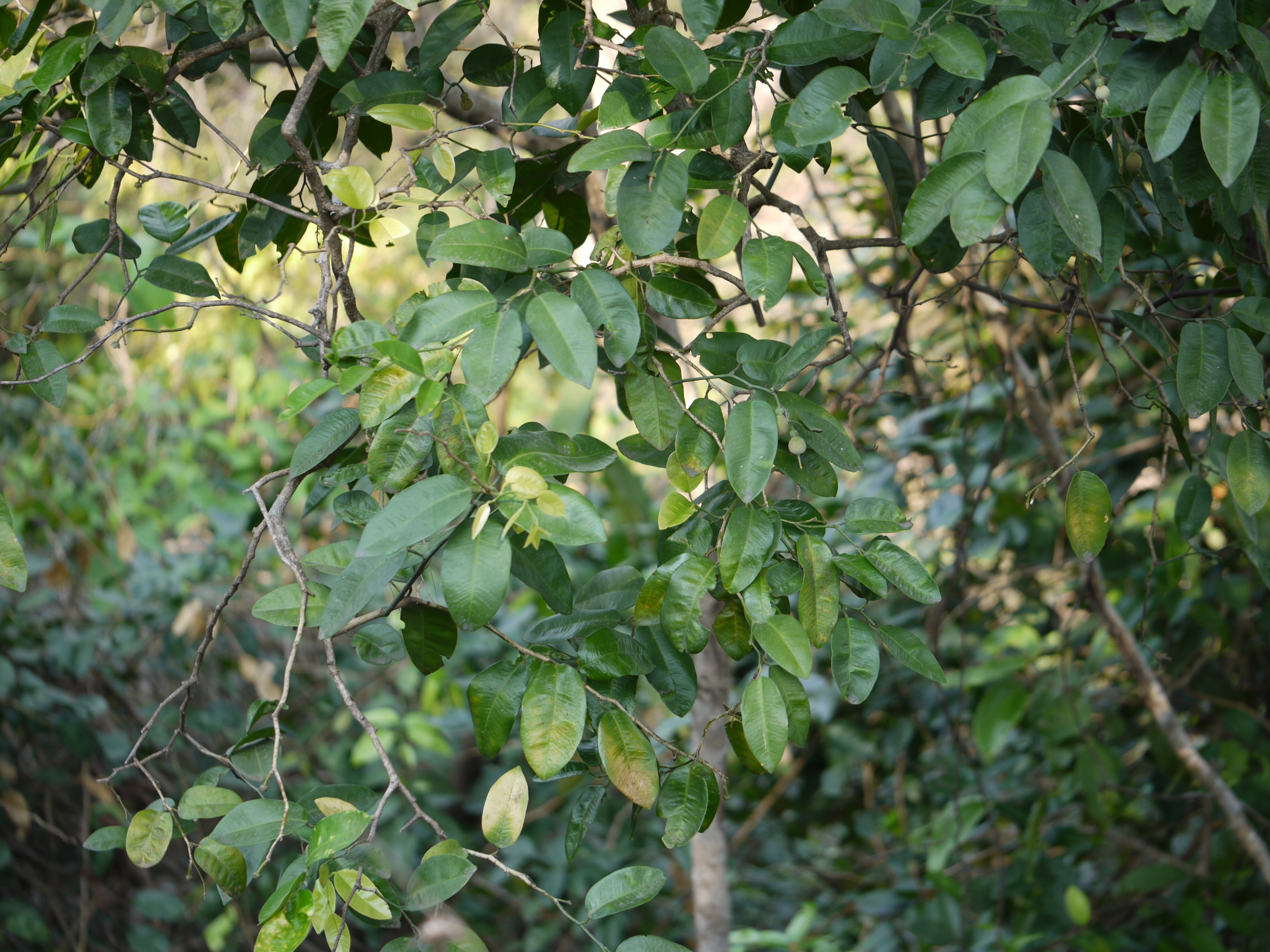

Scientific classification
- Kingdom: Plantae
- Clade: Tracheophytes
- Clade: Angiosperms
- Clade: Eudicots
- Clade: Rosids
- Order: Sapindales
- Family: Rutaceae
- Subfamily: Aurantioideae
- Genus: Paramignya; Wight

= Paramignya =

Genus of plants

Paramignya is a genus of flowering plants belonging to the family Rutaceae.

Its native range is Southern China to Tropical Asia.

== Species ==
Species:

- Paramignya andamanica (King) Tanaka
- Paramignya armata (Thwaites) Bedd. ex Oliv.
- Paramignya beddomei Tanaka
- Paramignya citrifolia Oliv.
- Paramignya confertifolia Swingle
- Paramignya cuspidata (Ridl.) Burkill
- Paramignya grandiflora Oliv.
- Paramignya hispida (Pierre ex Guillaumin) Pierre ex Guillaumin
- Paramignya lobata Burkill
- Paramignya mindanaensis Merr.
- Paramignya monophylla Wight
- Paramignya petelotii Guillaumin
- Paramignya rectispinosa Craib
- Paramignya scandens (Griff.) Craib
- Paramignya surasiana Craib
- Paramignya trimera (Oliv.) Burkill
