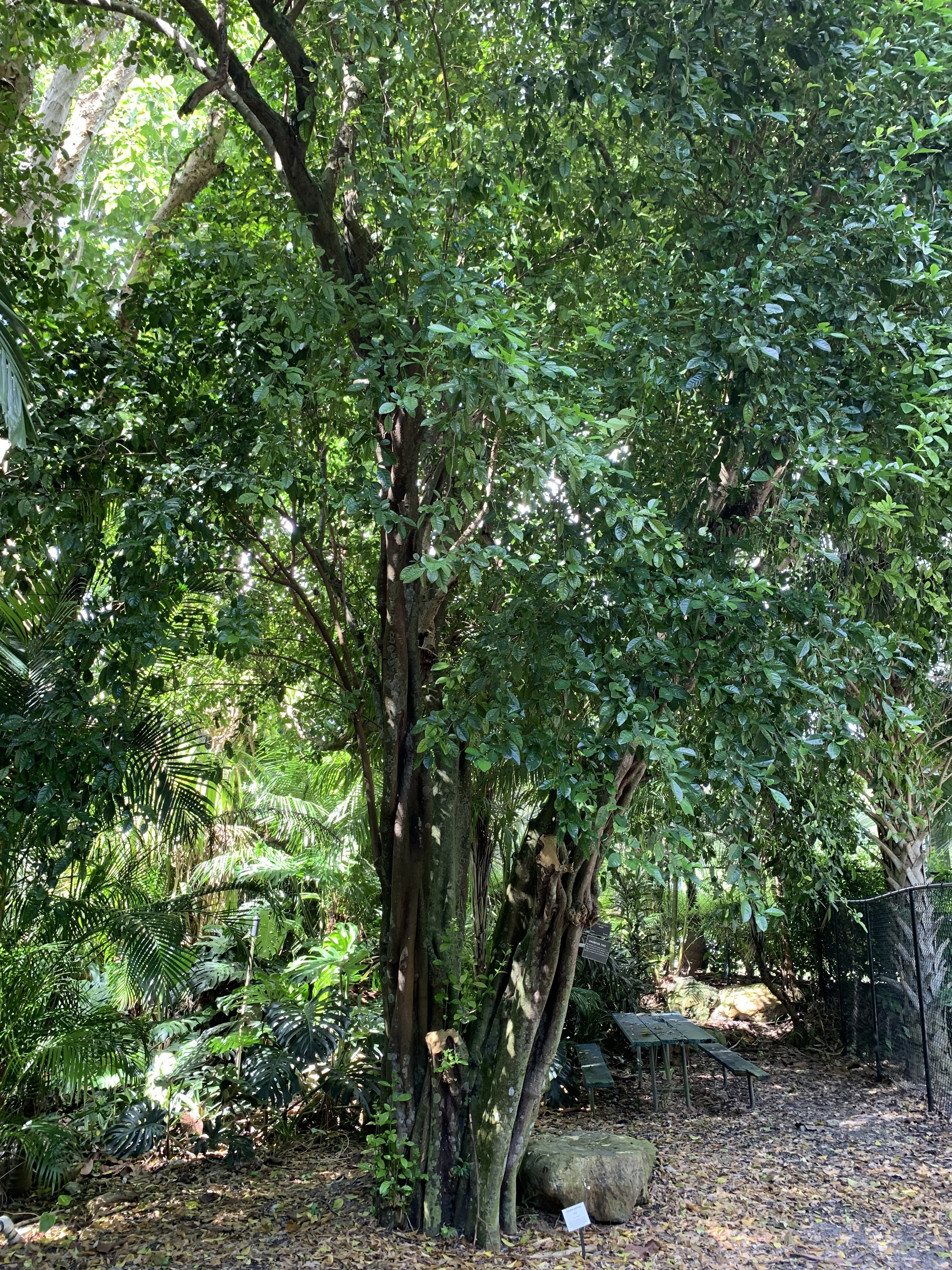
- In Flamingo Tropical Garden in Davie, Florida, US

Scientific classification
- Kingdom: Plantae
- Clade: Tracheophytes
- Clade: Angiosperms
- Clade: Eudicots
- Clade: Rosids
- Order: Sapindales
- Family: Rutaceae
- Subfamily: Aurantioideae
- Genus: Swinglea; Merr.
- Species: S. glutinosa

Binomial name
- Swinglea glutinosa (Blanco) Merr.

Synonyms
- Aegle glutinosa (Blanco) Merr.; Belou glutinosa (Blanco) Skeels; Chaetospermum glutinosum (Blanco) Swingle; Limonia glutinosa Blanco

= Swinglea =

Species of flowering plant

Swinglea is a monotypic genus of flowering plants belonging to the family Rutaceae. It only contains a single species, Swinglea glutinosa.

It is native to the Philippines.

The genus name of Swinglea is in honour of Walter Tennyson Swingle (1871–1952), an American agricultural botanist who contributed greatly to the classification and taxonomy of citrus. The genus has one known synonym of Chaetospermum (M.Roem.) Swingle. The Latin specific epithet of glutinosa is derived from gluten meaning glue. Both the genus and the species were first described and published in J. Arnold Arbor. Vol.8 on page 131 in 1927.
