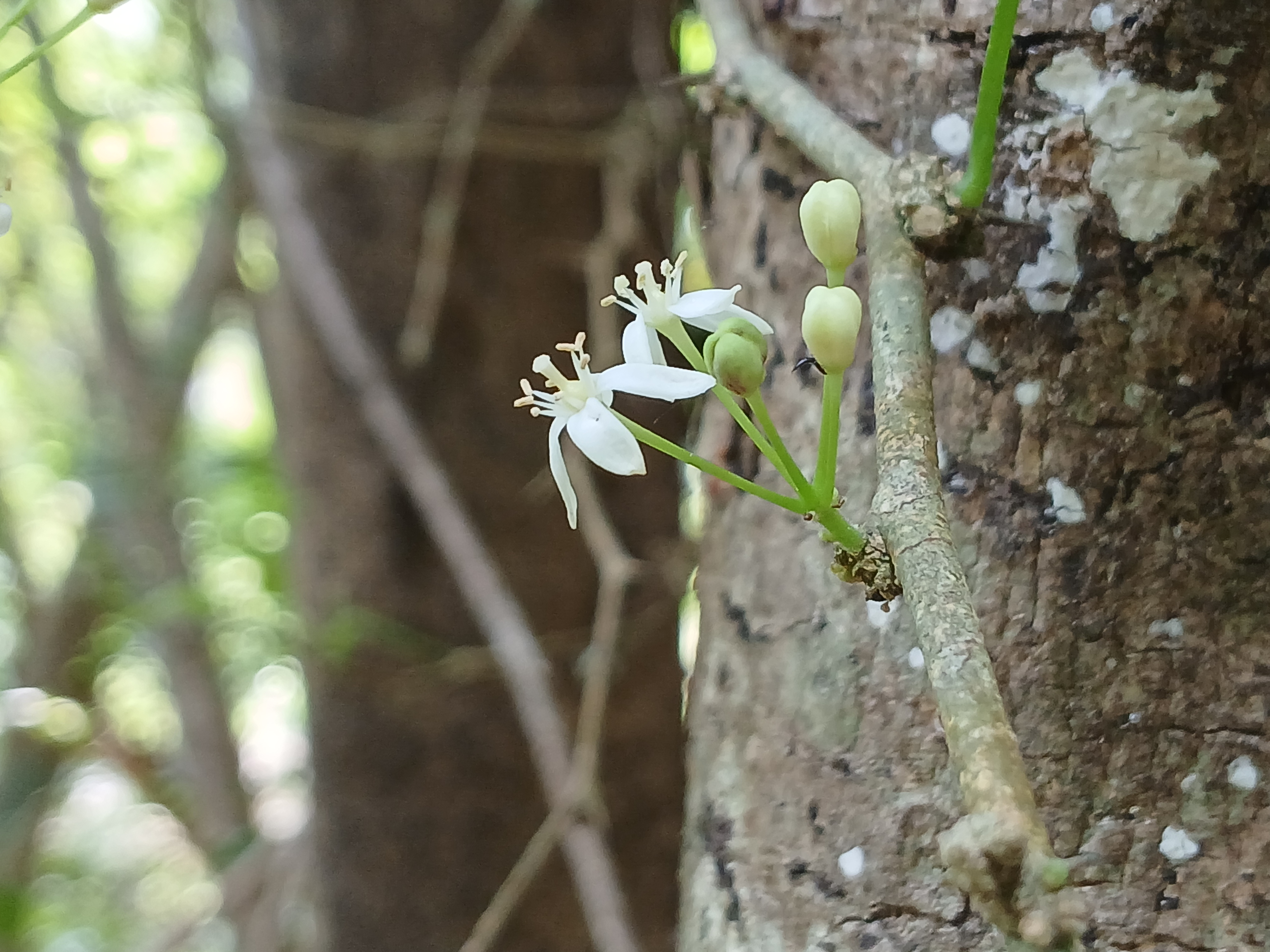
- Naringi crenulata

Scientific classification
- Kingdom: Plantae
- Clade: Tracheophytes
- Clade: Angiosperms
- Clade: Eudicots
- Clade: Rosids
- Order: Sapindales
- Family: Rutaceae
- Subfamily: Aurantioideae
- Genus: Naringi; Adans.

= Naringi =

Genus of plants

Naringi is a genus of flowering plants belonging to the family Rutaceae.

Its native range is India to Indo-China.

== Species ==
Species:

- Naringi crenulata (Roxb.) Nicolson
