= 1868 in art =

Events from the year 1868 in art.

== Events ==
- 1 May – The Salon of 1868 opens at the Palace of Industry in Paris
- 4 May – Royal Academy Exhibition of 1868 opens in London. It is the last to be held at the National Gallery before a move to Burlington House
- Rodolphe Julian establishes the Académie Julian in Paris.
- Deutsches Gewerbe-Museum zu Berlin established.
- English merchant Francis Cook, 1st Viscount of Monserrate, begins to add paintings to his art collection at Doughty House, Richmond, London.
- Due to debt and eviction, Claude Monet attempts suicide by throwing himself into the Seine river.

== Works ==
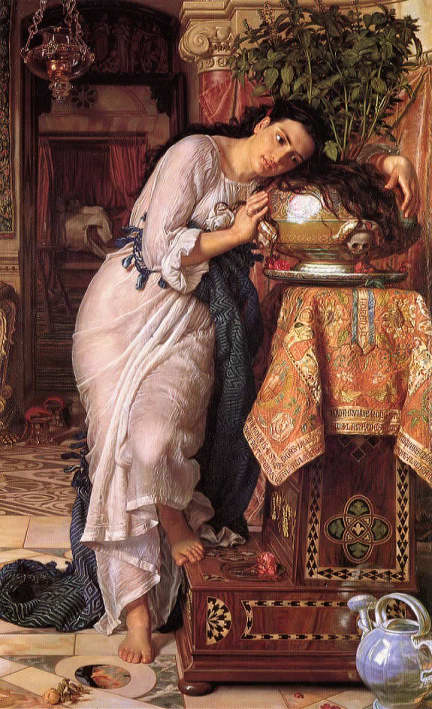
Holman Hunt – Isabella and the Pot of Basil

- Lawrence Alma-Tadema
  - Phidias Showing the Frieze of the Parthenon to his Friends
  - A Roman Flower Market
- Edward Armitage – Herod's Birthday Feast
- Frédéric Bazille
  - Self-portrait
  - View of the Village
- Jean-Adolphe Beaucé – Entry of the French Expeditionary Force into Mexico City
- Albert Bierstadt
  - Among the Sierra Nevada, California
  - In the Sierras
  - Tyrolean Landscape
  - Yosemite Valley, Yosemite Park (approximate date)
- John Brett – Christmas Morning, 1866
- Jean-Baptiste Carpeaux – Why Born Enslaved! or Why Born a Slave? – French Pourquoi! Naitre esclave? or La Negresse (first conceived)
- Léon-Alexandre Delhomme – Democritus meditating on the seat of the soul (sculpture)
- Lowes Cato Dickinson – Gladstone's Cabinet of 1886
- Lot Flannery – Abraham Lincoln (marble, Washington, D.C.)
- Jean-Léon Gérôme – The Execution of Marshal Ney
- George P. A. Healy – The Peacemakers
- William Holman Hunt
  - The Birthday
  - Isabella and the Pot of Basil (large and small versions)
- Charles-Auguste Lebourg – The Child and the Grasshopper (marble)
- Édouard Manet
  - The Balcony
  - Luncheon in the Studio (Neue Pinakothek, Munich)
  - Madame Manet at the Piano (Musée d'Orsay, Paris)
  - Portrait of Emile Zola (Musée d’Orsay, Paris)
- John Everett Millais – Vanessa
- Claude Monet – On the Bank of the Seine, Bennecourt
- Albert Joseph Moore
  - Azaleas
  - A Greek Play (tempera panel for proscenium of Queen's Theatre, Long Acre, London)
- Elisabet Ney – King Ludwig II of Bavaria (sculpture)
- Vasily Perov – At the Railroad
- Val Prinsep – A Venetian Lover
- Pierre-Auguste Renoir
  - In the Summer (The Bohemian girl)
  - The Boy with the Cat
  - Skaters in the Bois de Boulogne
- Dante Gabriel Rossetti
  - The Blue Silk Dress (Walker Art Gallery (National Museums Liverpool))
  - Lady Lilith (original version)
  - Pia de' Tolomei
- Frederick Sandys – Medea
- James Tissot – Le Balcon du Cercle de la rue Royale
- Frederick Walker – The Vagrants

== Births ==
- April 6 – Helen Hyde, American etcher and engraver (died 1919)
- April 12 – Ella Gaunt Smith, American doll-maker (died 1932)
- April 21 – Alfred Henry Maurer, American modernist painter (suicide 1932)
- April 28 – Émile Bernard, French Post-Impressionist painter (died 1941)
- June 5 – Johan Thorn Prikker, Dutch art nouveau painter and stained-glass artist (died 1932)
- June 6 – Samuel Jessurun de Mesquita, Dutch graphic artist (killed 1944)
- June 18 – Georges Lacombe, French sculptor and painter (died 1916)
- July 16 – Willy Gretor, born Vilhelm Petersen, Danish-born painter and art dealer (died 1923)
- October 8
  - Fidus (Hugo Reinhold Karl Johann Höppener), German graphic designer (died 1948)
  - Max Slevogt, German artist (died 1932)
- November 11 – Édouard Vuillard, French painter (died 1940)
- November 23 – Mary Brewster Hazelton, American portrait painter (died 1953)

== Deaths ==
- January 15 – Lucie Ingemann, Danish religious painter (born 1792)
- January 28 – Adalbert Stifter, Austrian writer, poet, painter, and pedagogue (born 1805)
- February 14 – Emil Bærentzen, Danish portrait painter and lithographer (born 1799)
- February 21 – Giuseppe Abbati, Italian painter (born 1836)
- February 26 – Georg Heinrich Busse, German landscape painter and engraver (born 1810)
- March – John Burnet, Scottish engraver and painter (born 1781/1784)
- March 10 – Herman Wilhelm Bissen, Danish sculptor (born 1798)
- March 29 – Felix Slade, English lawyer, art collector and founder of the Slade School of Art (born 1788)
- May 2 – James Wilson Carmichael, English marine painter (born 1800)
- May 24 – Emanuel Leutze, German American painter (born 1816)
- August 10
  - George Cattermole, English illustrator and watercolourist (born 1800)
  - Adah Isaacs Menken, American actress, painter and poet (born 1835)
- September 13 – Richard Rothwell, Irish portrait and genre painter (born 1800)
- September 13 – Angélique Mezzara, French portrait painter and miniaturist (born 1793)
- September 27 – August Piepenhagen, German painter active in Bohemia (born 1791)
- October 10 – François-Édouard Picot, French historic painter (born 1786)
- November 23
  - Claude Victor de Boissieu, French artist and local politician (born 1783)
  - Charles Méryon, French etcher (born 1821)
- December 1 – John Edward Carew, Irish sculptor (born c. 1782)
- date unknown
  - Johann Baptist Dallinger von Dalling, Austrian painter (born 1782)
  - Louis Royer, Austrian Netherlands sculptor (born 1793)
