= Gustave Dutailly =

French botanist, politician and art collector

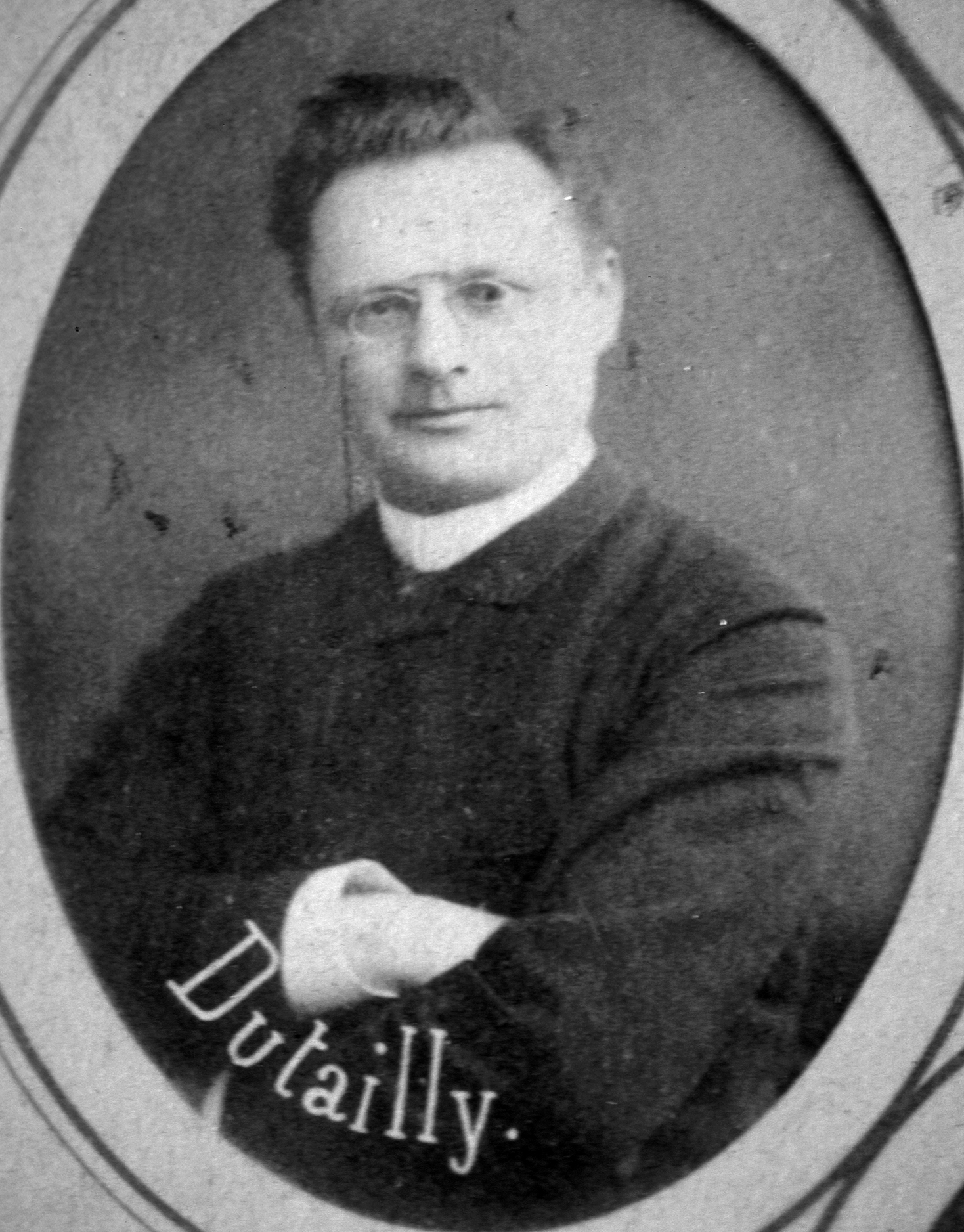
Gustave Dutailly (1846–1910)

Gustave Dutailly (2 August 1846, in Meuvy (Haute-Marne) – 4 February 1906) was a French botanist, politician and art collector.

He studied plant physiology in Paris, and in the meantime made contributions to the Dictionnaire de botanique. In 1870, he became a member of the Société linnéenne de Paris, and in 1875 a member of the Société botanique de France. In 1880, he was appointed a professor of botany to the faculty of sciences at Lyon. In Lyon, he also served as director of the Parc de la Tête d'Or. From 1882, he was a member of the Société d'anthropologie de Lyon.

In 1881, he resigned his professorship in order to pursue scientific activities that included work associated with the Association française pour l’avancement des sciences (French Association for the Advancement of Sciences). During the same year, he became a deputy (political title) of the arrondissement of Chaumont, and in 1885 was named deputy of the department of Haute-Marne.

A passionate collector of poster art, during his lifetime he amassed a collection of 5000 posters composed by artists that included Henri de Toulouse-Lautrec, Jules Chéret, Pierre Bonnard, Leonetto Cappiello, Eugène Grasset, Adolphe Léon Willette and Jules-Alexandre Grün. At the time of his death, his art collection as well as a library of 3500 volumes were bequeathed to the city of Chaumont. His collection is housed at the Book and Poster Center in Chaumont.

Politically, he served three times in the National Assembly for the far-left, being elected 1881, 1885 and 1898.

In the family Rutaceae, from the island of New Caledonia, 2 genera were named in his honour. The genus of Dutaillyea by Henri Ernest Baillon, in 1872. Also the genus of Dutailliopsis by American botanist T.G.Hartley in 1997.
