= Antoine Guillemet =

French painter (1843–1918)

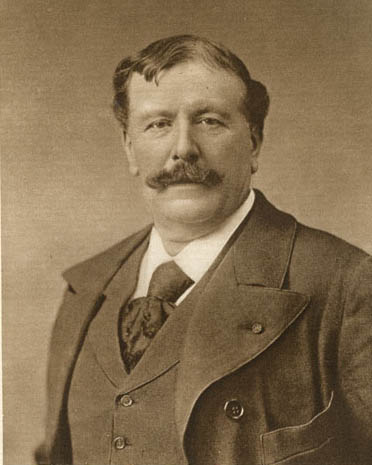
- Jean-Baptiste-Antoine Guillemet
- Born: June 30, 1843; Chantilly (Oise)
- Died: May 19, 1918; Mareuil-sur-Belle (Dordogne)
- Education: Jean-Baptiste-Camille Corot; Charles-François Daubigny; Gustave Courbet
- Movement: Realism, Impressionism
- Awards: Commandeur

Signature
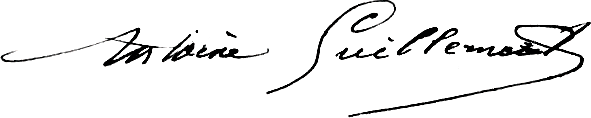

Jean-Baptiste-Antoine Guillemet (French pronunciation: [ʒɑ̃ batist ɑ̃twan ɡijmɛ]; June 30, 1843 in Chantilly (Oise) – May 19, 1918 in Mareuil-sur-Belle (Dordogne)) was a French renowned landscape painter and longtime Jury member of the Salon des Artistes Francais. He was one of the first 19th-century artists to paint modern life, and a pivotal figure in the transition from Realism to Impressionism.

== Biography ==
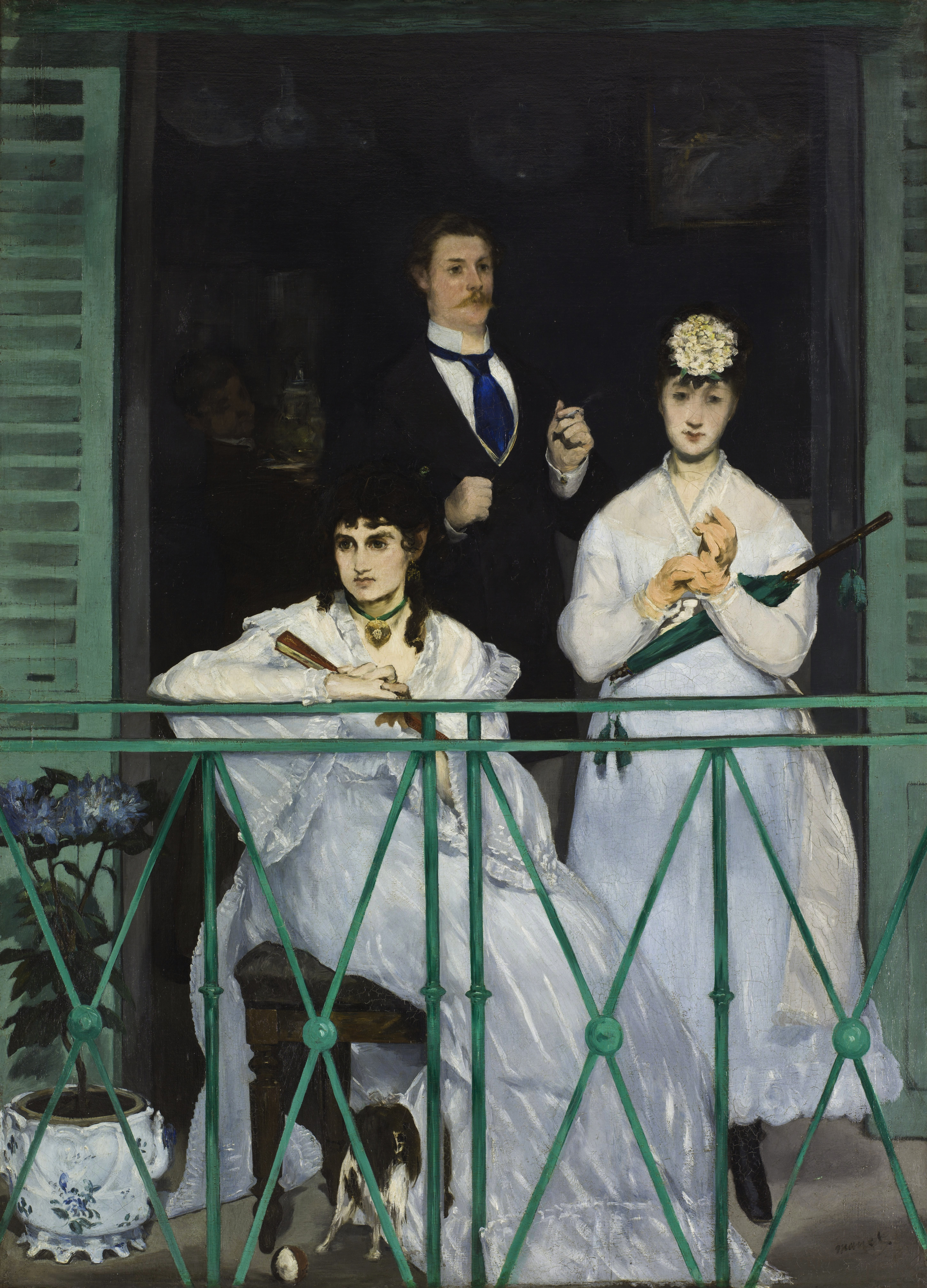
Édouard Manet: The Balcony. Antoine Guillemet

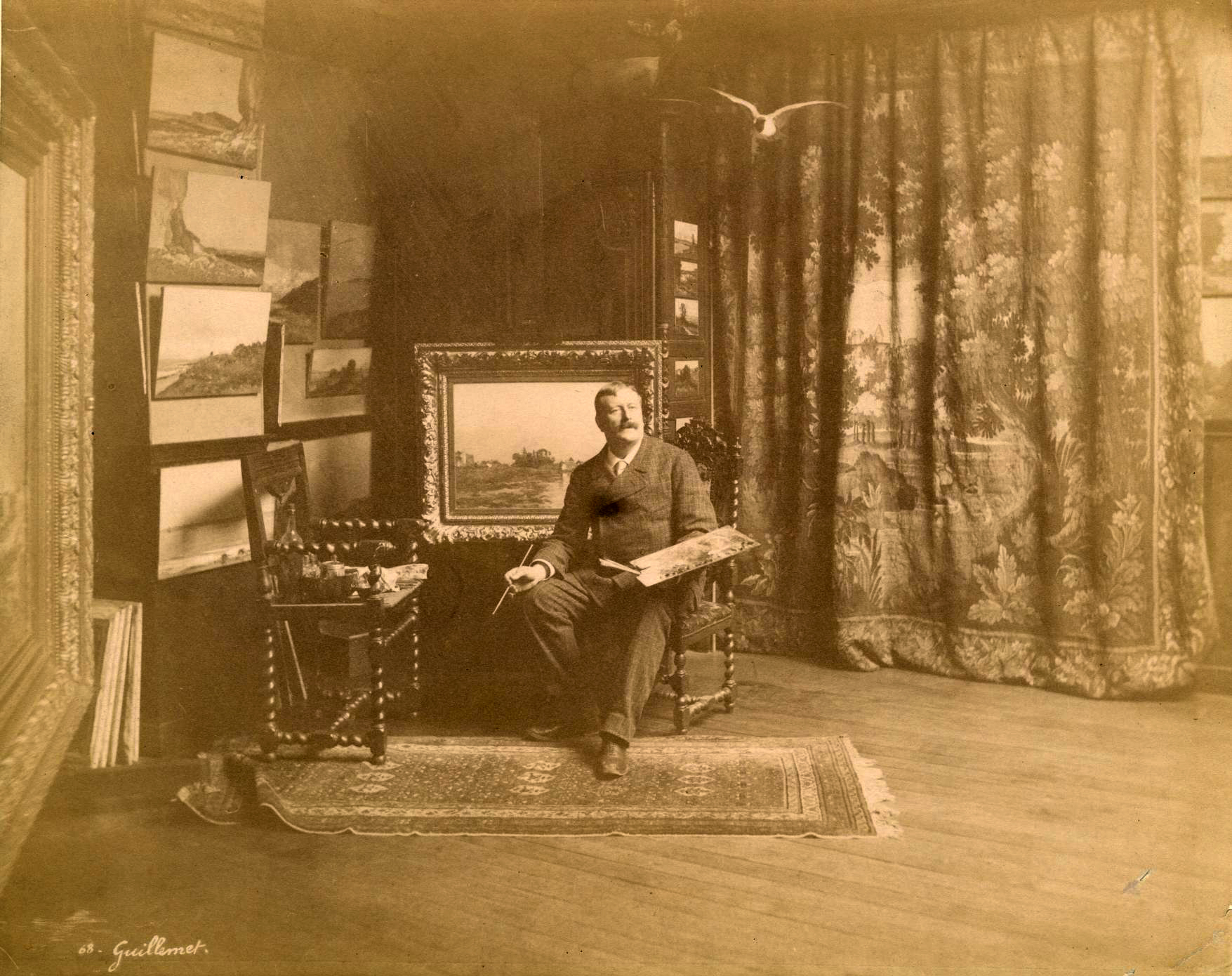
Antoine Guillemet in his Paris studio, c.1890

Antoine Guillemet born in Chantilly, in the Oise, he studied under Jean-Baptiste-Camille Corot, Achille-François Oudinot (1820-1891), Charles-François Daubigny and Gustave Courbet.

Guillemet showed an early interest in sailing, a pursuit which was actively discouraged by his parents. He briefly studied law, but this too proved to be a false start. It was in 1859, when he received a commission from a local collector to copy Géricault's famous The Raft of the Medusa Musee d'Amiens, that Guillemet's career as an artist was launched.

Two years later, while still only twenty-one, Guillemet was introduced to Corot by Berthe Morisot. Like many of the young artists, Guillemet affectionately called Corot Papa and remained a lifelong admirer of the artist. This meeting led to Guillemet's studying with Corot's pupil Achille Oudinot, and it was through Oudinot, who had property at Auvers-sur-Oise, that Guillemet met Daubigny, Ernest Meissonier, Honoré Daumier, and Antoine-Louis Barye, among others. By 1864 Guillemet had also encountered Édouard Manet, Alfred Stevens, Camille Pissarro, Claude Monet, Gustave Courbet, and Paul Cézanne and later, Henri Fantin-Latour, Edgar Degas and Jean-Frédéric Bazille. When Cézanne finally exhibited at the Salon of 1882, his entry described him as ‘pupil of Guillemet’. It was Guillemet, in fact, who introduced Manet to Cézanne and who first took Émile Zola to Manet's studio.

Like almost every ambitious young artist Guillemet realized that he needed to make his mark at the Paris Salon, and in 1865 exhibited L'Etang de Bat (Isère). Just as Paris was important as a venue for the artist to exhibit, it also provided subjects for his brush. Ready to produce large works, unlike many of his contemporaries who sought a more immediate effect, he painted several views of the capital, often using the Seine with its bustling traffic as a central motif. At the Salon of 1874 Guillemet's ambitious entry was a nine-foot painting titled Bercy en décembre, which was praised by both critics and the public and which was promptly purchased by the state for the Musée du Luxembourg, then the national museum for contemporary art. This early success may also explain why the artist continued to show at the Salon instead of accepting the invitation of his friends to join them in exhibiting at the Impressionists shows. Guillemet continued to paint coastal scenes in Normandy, but buoyed by his initial success, he returned throughout his career to painting views of Paris, with several more works acquired by the state, encouraged by the consistent praise of his friend, Émile Zola.

In the Exposition Universelle (1889), celebrating the centennial of the French Revolution, Guillemet was represented by seven paintings, including Le Vieux Quai de Bercy and Paris, vue prise de Meudon. In 1891 Guillemet painted a view up the Seine from the sight of these pictures towards the eastern end of the Quai de Bercy titled Le quai de Bercy à Charenton, which was purchased by the Musée de la Ville de Paris, now the Musée Carnavalet and in the same year he produced the present picture, La Seine à Conflans-Charenton. His large-scale works also earned him the description as the ‘grand bourgeois’ of painting, and Manet's criticism that his style was sometimes "excessive". Nonetheless this series is an astonishing achievement, both a valuable record of the city as it was just before the turn of the century and a brilliant demonstration of the ability of a painter to capture the hustle and bustle of a great city while retaining a sense of light and atmosphere that is true to nature.

Between 1868 and 1869, he posed for Manet's painting The Balcony.

== Paintings ==
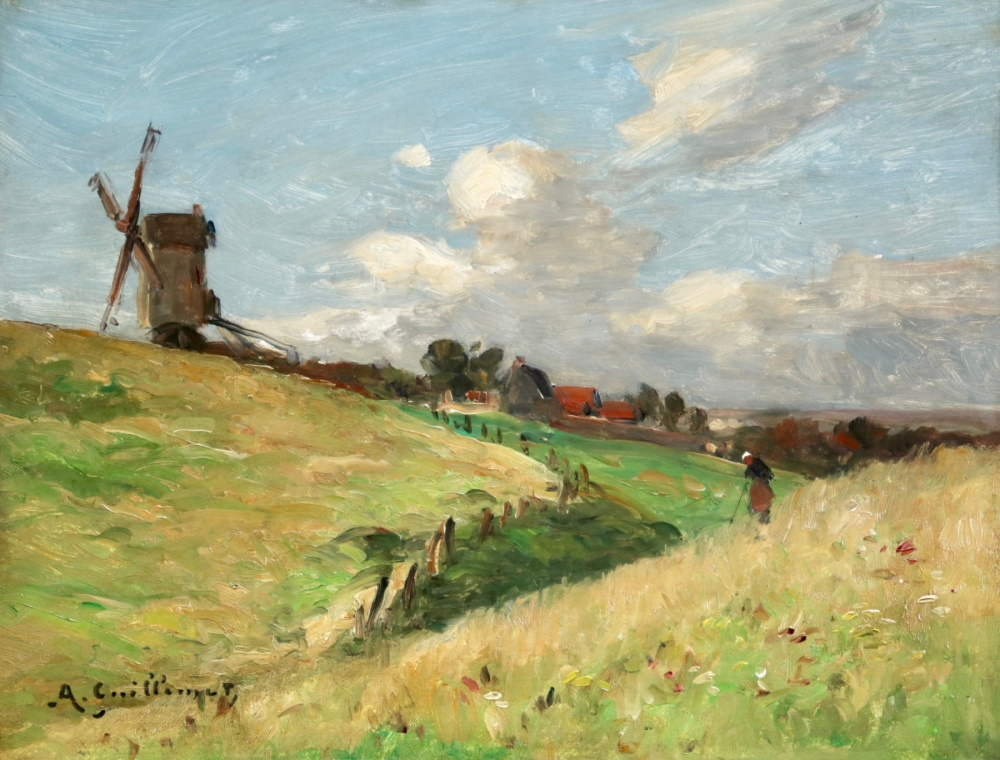
In The Fields

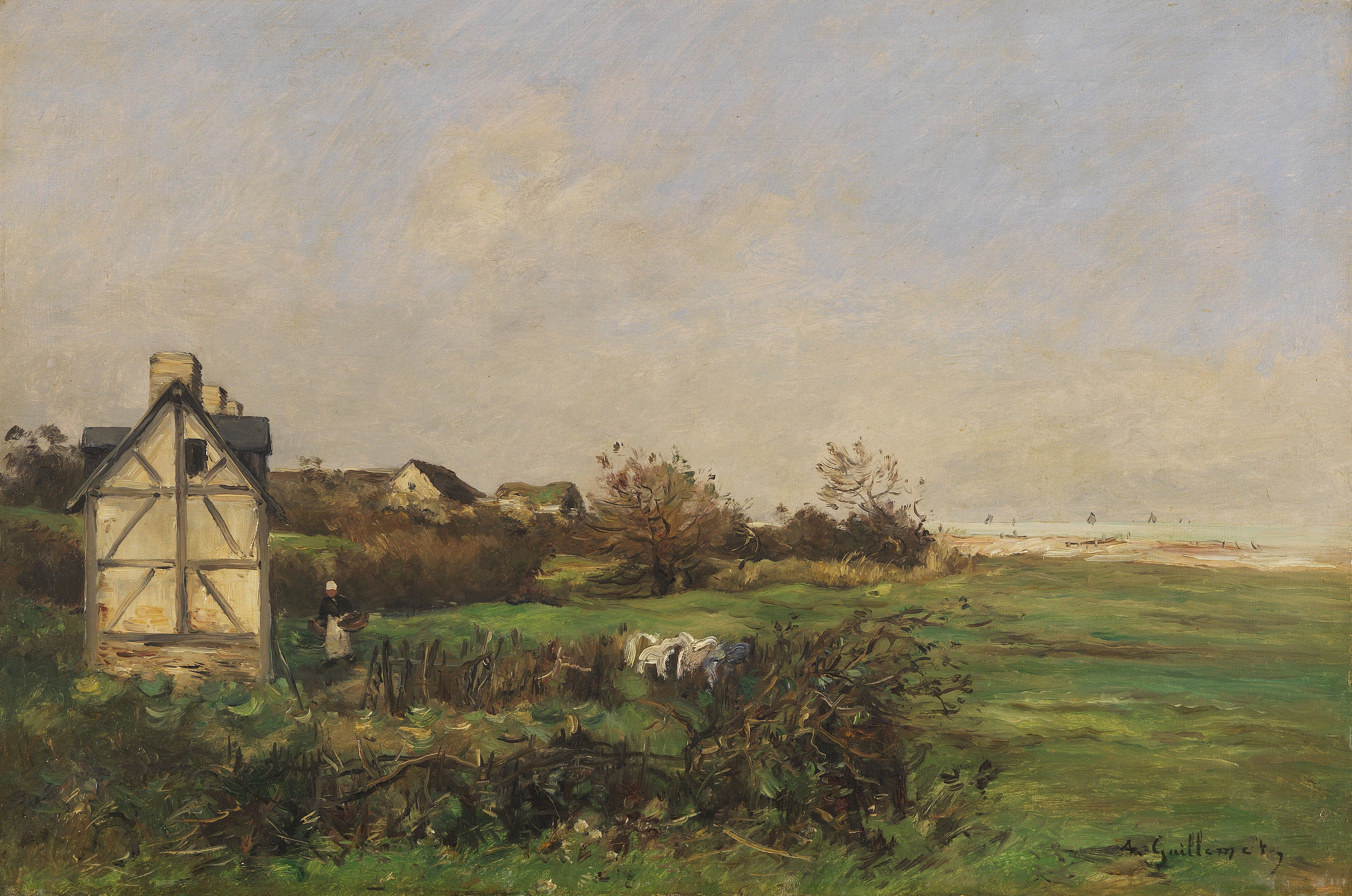
Landscape with Farmhouse
and Peasant Woman

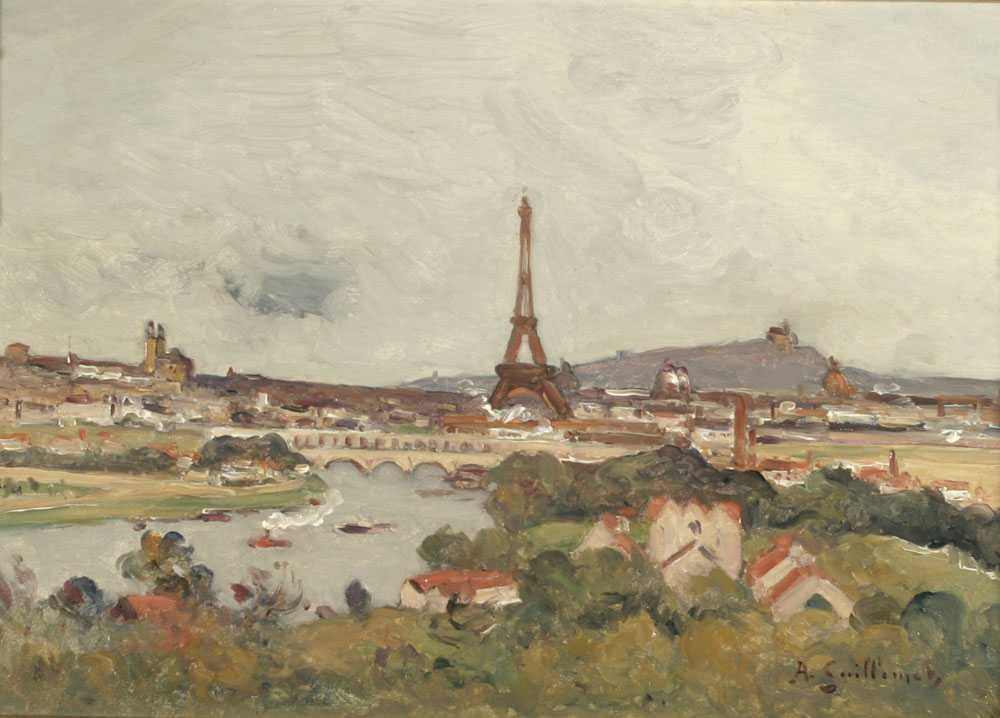
Eiffel Tower

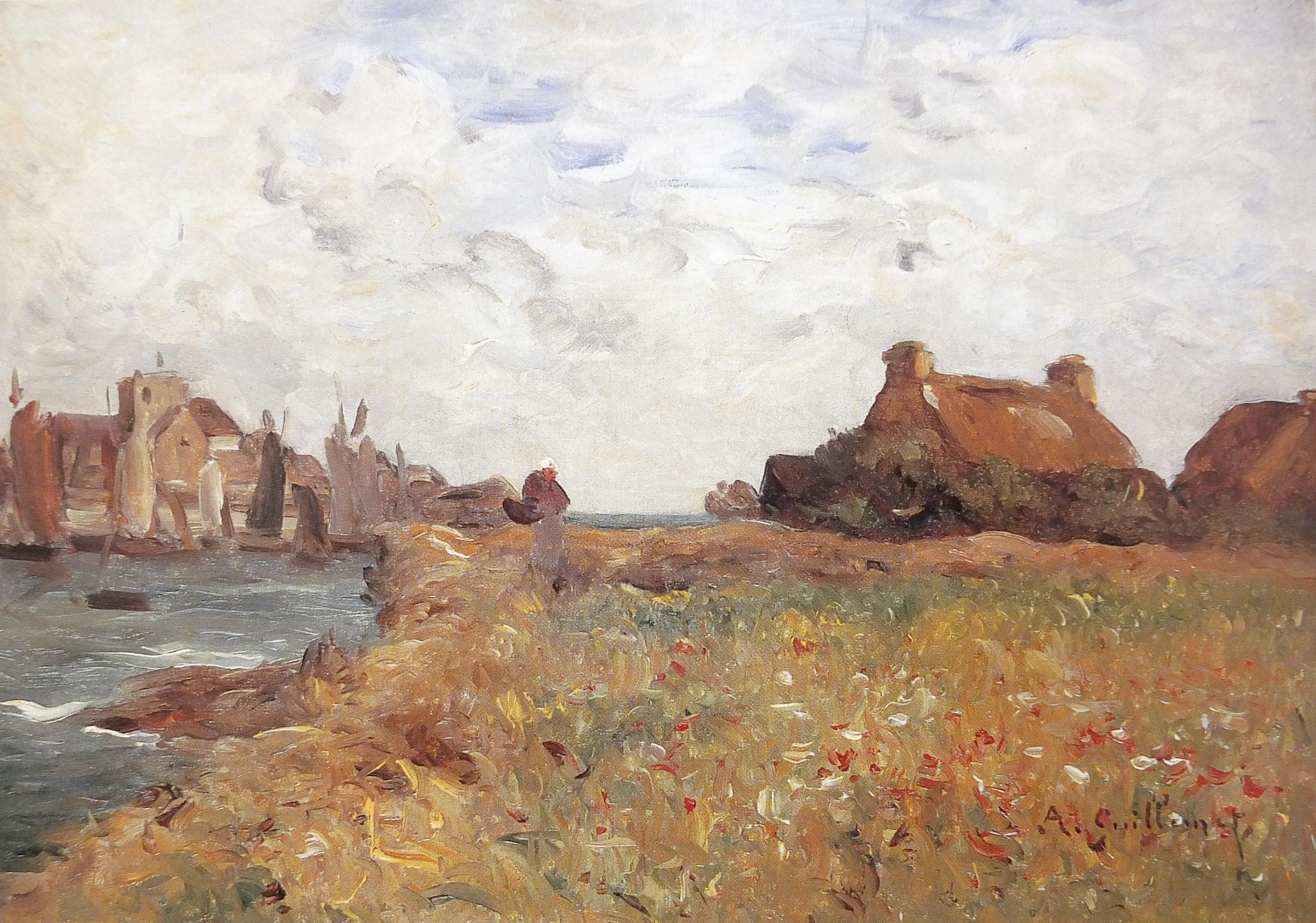
The Port of Barfleur

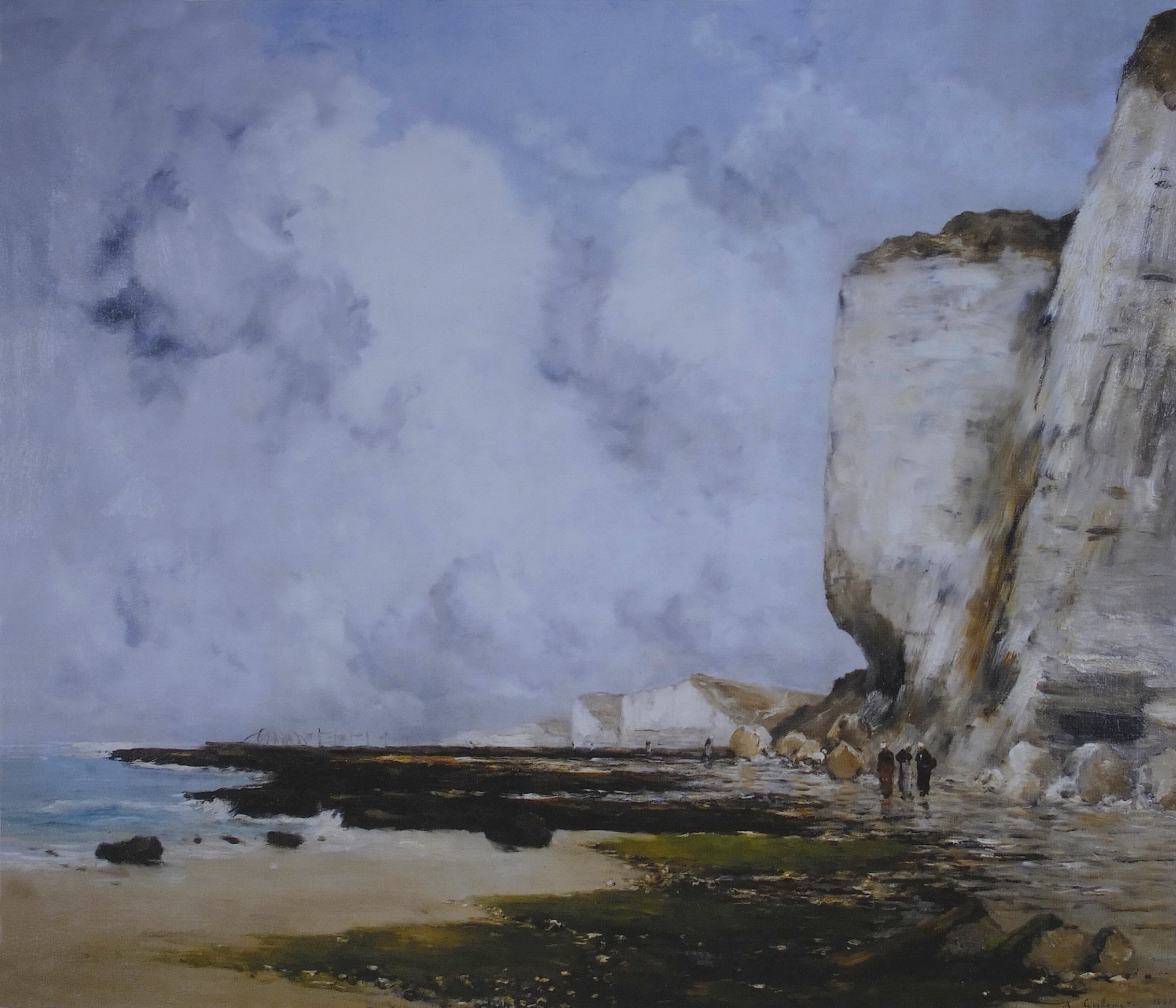
Volcanic Cliffs at Low Tide

== Pupils ==
Guillemet's students included Paul Cézanne and Jules-Alexandre Grün.

== References and sources ==
Sources

- Antoine Guillemet File, Documentation du Musée d'Orsay, Paris.
- Album Mariani: portraits, biographies, autographes / par A. Mariani; p. 126 Gallica BnF
- Paul Cézanne; Ambroise Vollard; Gallica BnF
- Dictionnaire universel des contemporains: contenant toutes les personnes notables de la France et des pays étrangers...: ouvrage rédigé et tenu à jour, avec le concours d'écrivains et de savants de tous les pays (Sixième éd. entièrement refondue et considérablement augmentée)/ par G. Vapereau; Gallica BnF
- GUILLEMET; cosmopolitanart.com
