= Majas on a Balcony =

Painting by Francisco de Goya

- Majas en el balcón (Spanish)
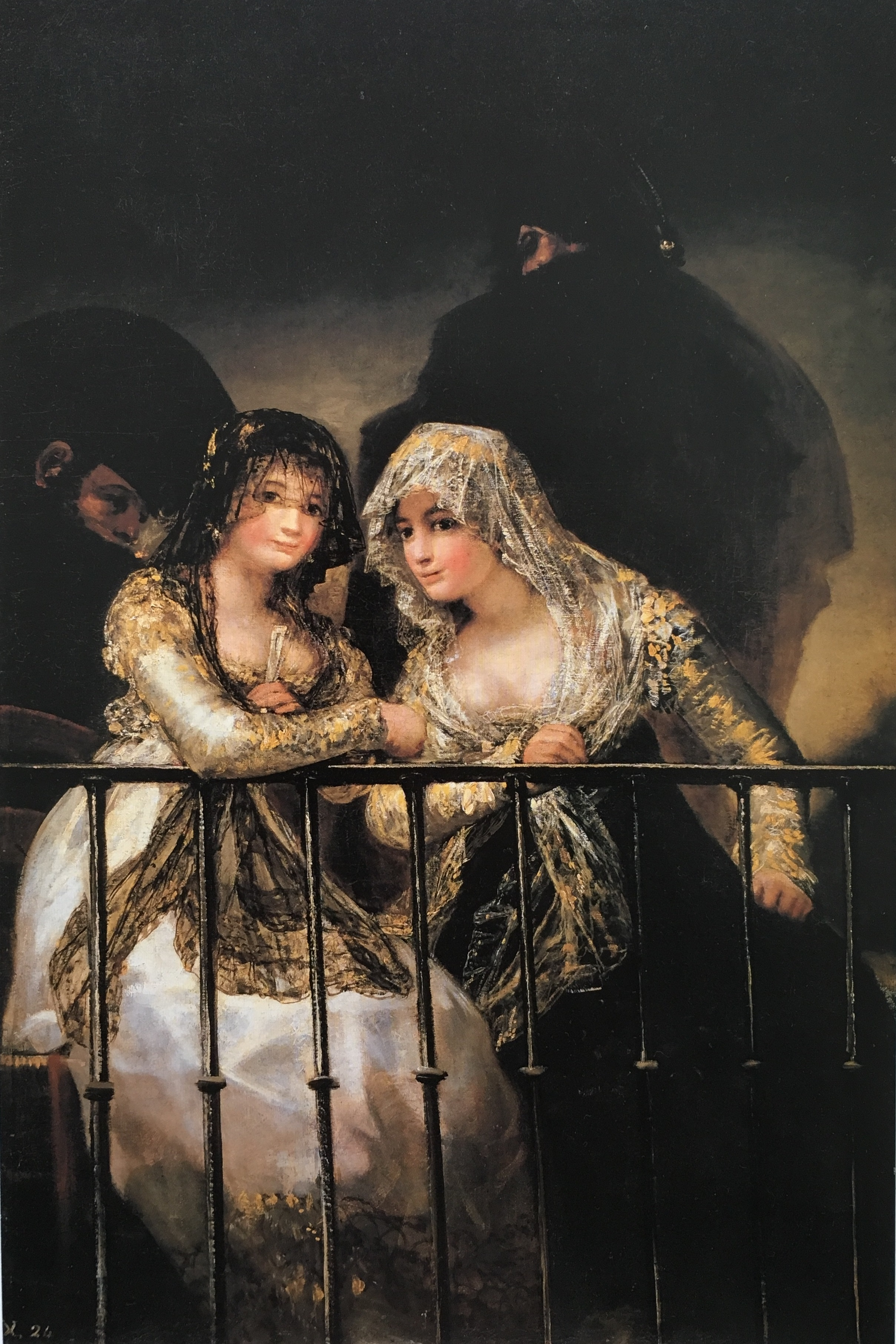
- Artist: Francisco Goya
- Type: Oil on canvas
- Dimensions: 162 cm × 107 cm (64 in × 42 in)
- Location: Rothschild collection

Majas on a Balcony (Spanish: Las majas en el balcón) is an oil painting by Francisco Goya, completed between 1808 and 1814, while Spain was engaged in the state of conflict after the invasion of Napoleon's French forces. The painting in the collection of Edmond de Rothschild in Switzerland is thought to be the original. Another version at the Metropolitan Museum of Art, in New York City, is thought to be a copy. A further copy, attributed to Leonardo Alenza, is in the Pezzoli collection, in Paris.

Goya considered his "maja" works, such as this painting and his contemporaneous Maja and Celestina on the Balcony, a distraction from more serious works, such as his Disasters of War.

Goya's Majas on a Balcony inspired Édouard Manet's The Balcony.

== Description ==
The painting depicts two well-dressed women – "majas", beautiful young Spanish women in elaborate clothing including lace mantillas – sitting behind the balustrade of a balcony, with two men standing inconspicuously in the shadows behind. According to Sebastian Smee, both women are courtesans. Smee sees the two men as "threatening" as they "lurk in the shadows ... dressed in capes and cocked hats."

There is a strong contrast between the light colours of the women and their richly decorated clothing in the foreground, and the plain heavy clothing of the men lurking in the background whose dark hats and cloaks conceal their features. The painting has a strict geometric composition, with the top of the balustrade dividing the scene into two regions. The top of the balustrade also forms the diagonal of a square from which the position of the figures is measured: the pilasters of the balustrade are in the lower half of the square, and the women lean towards each other in a triangle formed from the top half of the square. The composition of the area above the balustrade falls into four equal quadrants of another square.

== Background ==
The painting was probably made for the artist's own pleasure, possibly to decorate his own house. The original was one of eight paintings sold by Goya's son Javier Goya to Baron Isidore Justin Séverin Taylor in 1836, and it was displayed at the Louvre in Louis Philippe's Spanish gallery from 1838 to 1848. It was held by Antoine, Duke of Montpensier; his son Infante Antonio, Duke of Galliera sold it to Paul Durand-Ruel around 1911, who sold it to the Rothschild family. While in Paris, Goya's painting was the inspiration for Édouard Manet's 1868–69 work The Balcony, which, in turn, inspired René Magritte to paint his version named "Perspective II, Manet's Balcony" in 1950 showing sitting and standing coffins in lieu of people.

== Versions ==
The Metropolitan Museum of Art in New York City holds a version of the painting that had come into the collection of Infante Sebastian of Portugal and Spain by 1835. It was thought to be a Goya original, although that has been in doubt since 1989, and the Met labels the painting at "attributed to Goya". It may be a replica from 1835, possibly by Goya's son Javier Goya, or a damaged and heavily restored original, possibly a copy commissioned by the Infante. It was confiscated by the Spanish state but returned to the Infante in 1860. The Infante's son, Francisco, Duke of Marchena, sold the painting to Durand-Ruel in 1905, who sold it to Henry Osborne Havemeyer. It was bequeathed from the estate of Louisine Havemeyer to the Metropolitan Museum of Art in 1929. It is largely similar to the Rothschild version, but the two right hand figures are in somewhat different positions.

A copy attributed to Leonardo Alenza was formerly in the collections of Serafin García de la Huerta, then of Marquis José de Salamanca, and then Pierre Bordeaux-Groult, and is now in the Pezzoli collection in Paris.

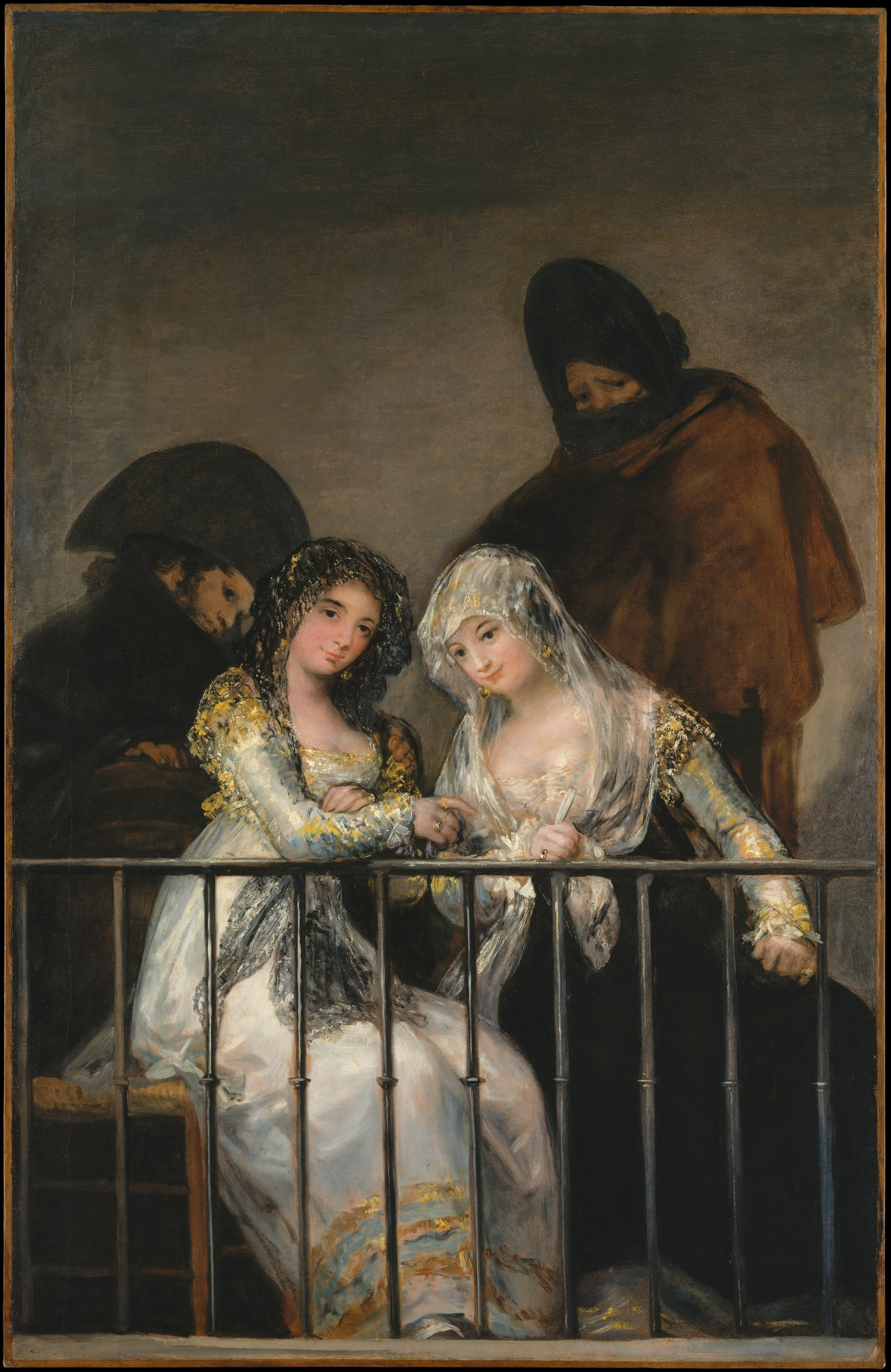
Version at the Metropolitan Museum of Art

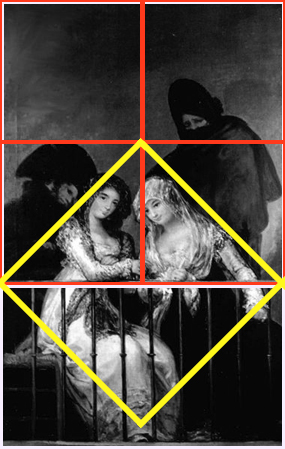
Geometrical composition

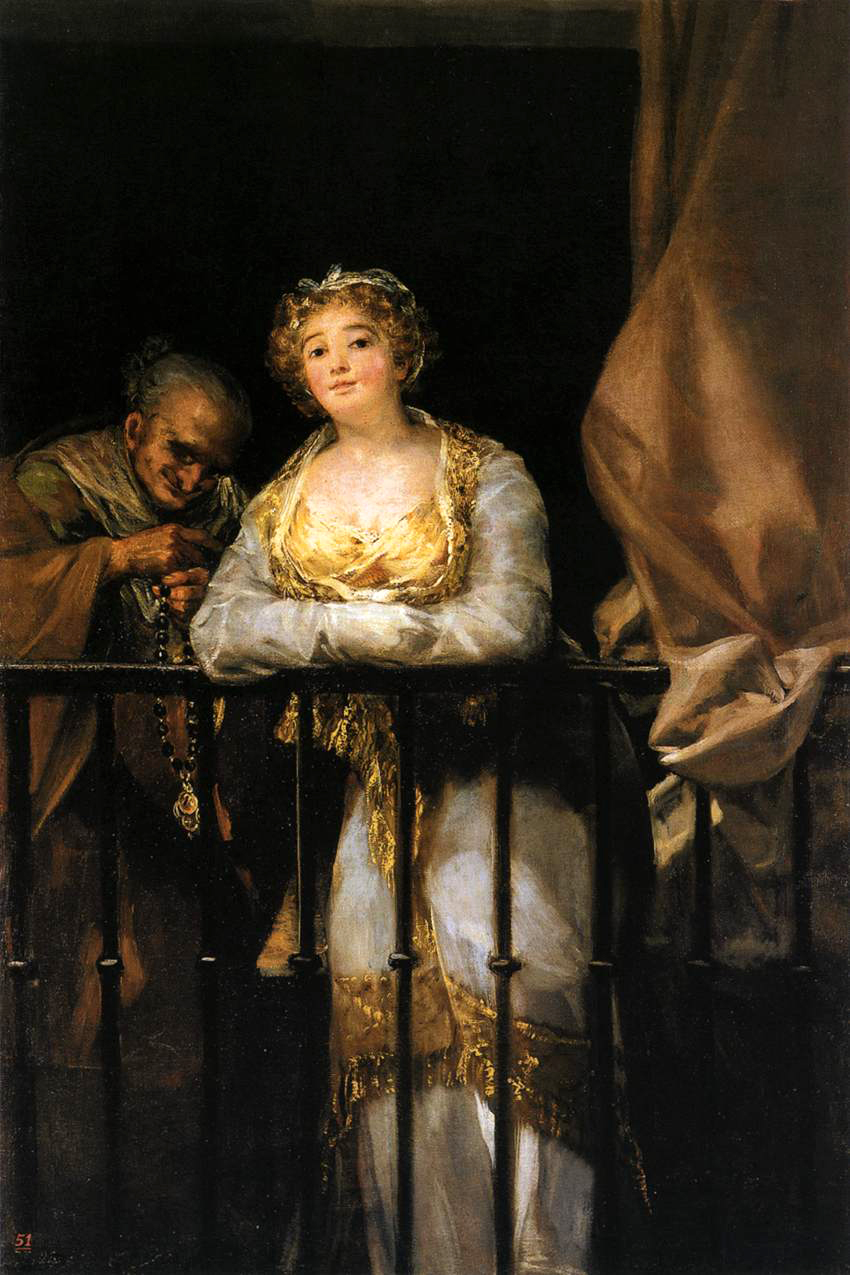
Maja and Celestina on the Balcony, Goya, 1808-12

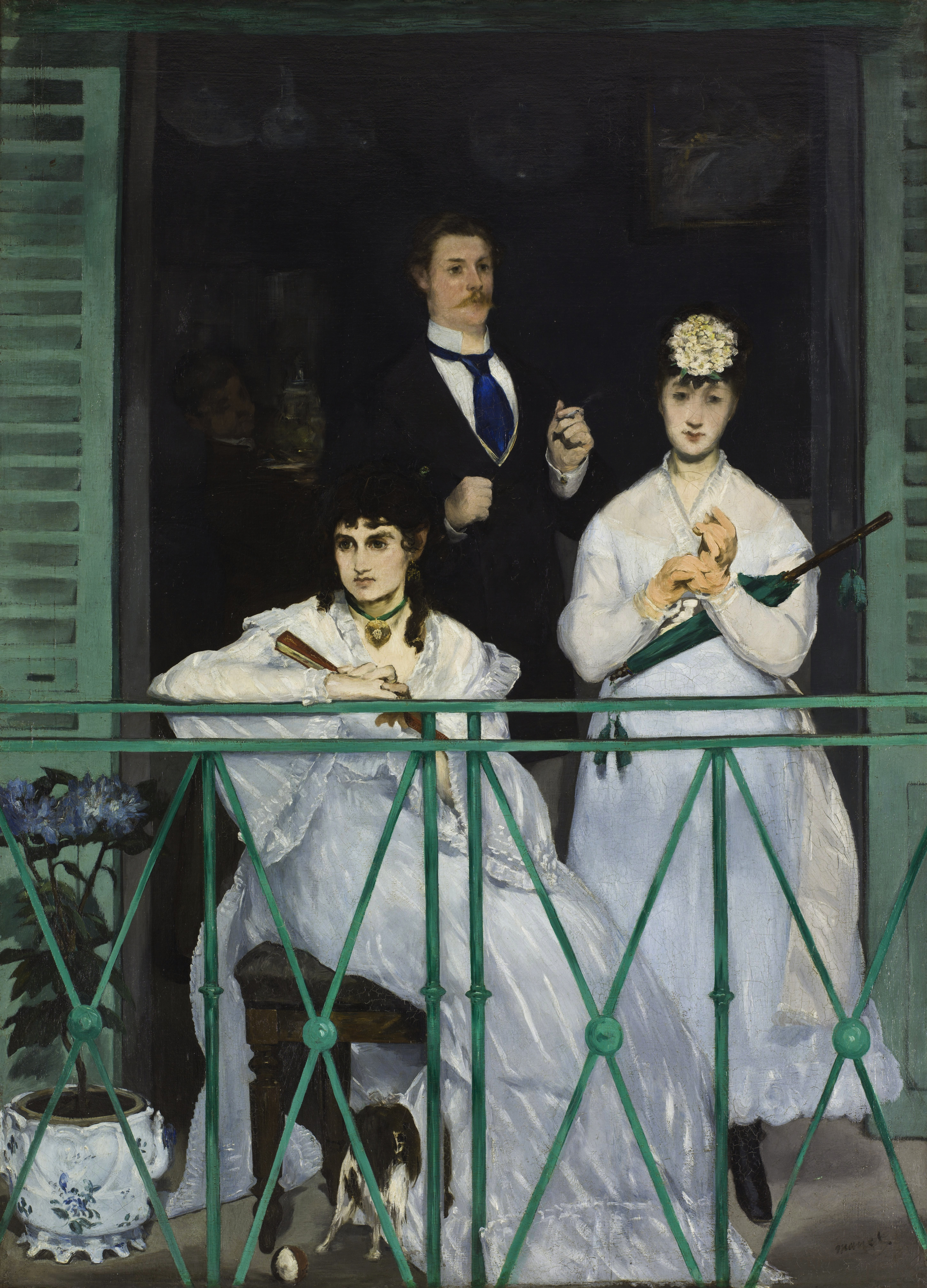
Édouard Manet, The Balcony, 1868-1869

== See also ==
- List of works by Francisco Goya
