= The Balcony (Manet) =

Painting by Édouard Manet

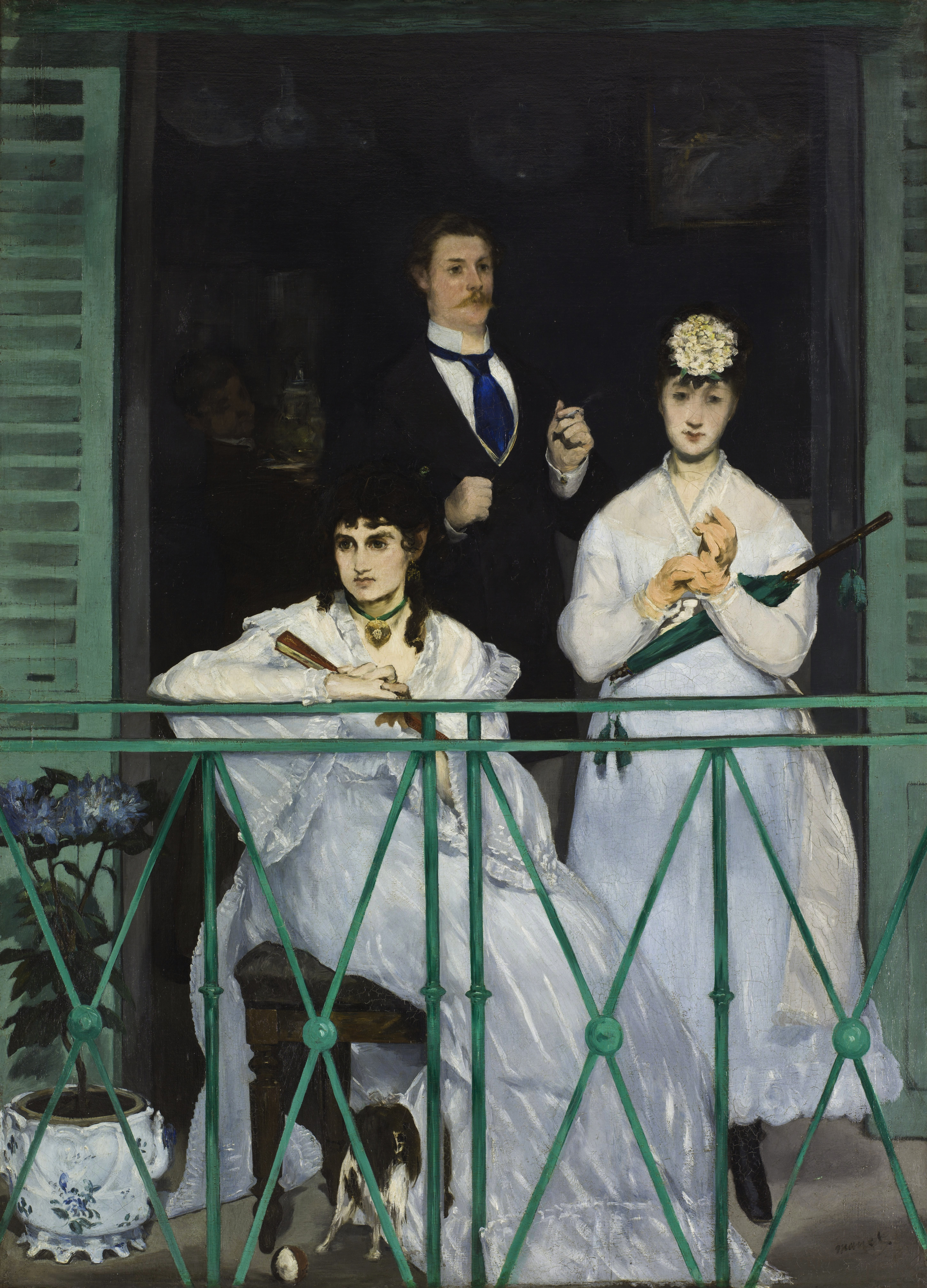
- Artist: Édouard Manet
- Year: 1868
- Medium: Oil on canvas
- Dimensions: 170 cm × 124 cm (67 in × 49 in)
- Location: Musée d'Orsay; Paris

The Balcony (French: Le balcon) is an 1868–69 oil painting by the French painter Édouard Manet. It depicts four figures on a balcony, one of whom is sitting: the painter Berthe Morisot, who married Manet's brother Eugène in 1874. In the centre is the painter Jean Baptiste Antoine Guillemet. On the right is Fanny Claus, a violinist. The fourth figure, partially obscured in the interior's background, is possibly Léon Leenhoff, Manet's son.

It was exhibited at the 1869 Paris Salon, and then kept by Manet until his death in 1883. It was sold to the painter Gustave Caillebotte in 1884, who left it to the French state in 1894. It is currently held at the Musée d'Orsay, Paris.

== Inspiration and description ==
The painting, inspired by Majas on the Balcony by Francisco Goya, was created at the same time and with the same purpose as Luncheon in the Studio.

The three characters, who were all friends of Manet, seem to be disconnected from each other: while Berthe Morisot, on the left, looks like a romantic and inaccessible heroine, the young violinist Fanny Claus and the painter Antoine Guillemet seem to display indifference. The boy in the background is probably Manet's son, Léon. Just behind the railings, there are a hydrangea in a ceramic pot, and a dog with a ball below Morisot's chair.

This was the first portrait of Morisot by Manet. Manet adopts a restrained colour palette, dominated by white, green and black, with accents of blue (Guillemet's tie) and red (Morisot's fan).

Manet made many preparatory studies, painting the four subjects individually many times: Guillemet as many as fifteen times. A preparatory study for The Balcony was painted at Boulogne in 1868. This unfinished portrait of Fanny Claus, the closest friend of Manet’s wife Suzanne Leenhoff; Claus married Manet's friend Pierre Prins in 1869. The work was bought after Manet's death in a studio sale by John Singer Sargent. The portrait had only been seen once in public since it was first painted in 1868, but in 2012 the Ashmolean Museum in Oxford succeeded in raising the funds to acquire it and keep it permanently in a public collection in the United Kingdom.

== Reception ==
The painting was not well received after it was exhibited at the Paris Salon in 1869. The bold green of the balcony rails attention from the Grand dictionnaire universel du XIXe siècle in 1878 which stated: "This painting was exhibited at the Salon of 1869 and is one of those who contributed to form this reputation for eccentricity realistic, this reputation of bad taste that was attached to Mr. Manet." The press considered the painting as "discordant". The contrast of colours (the background completely black, the white faces and clothes, the blue tie of the man, and the green railings) contributes to create an atmosphere of "mystery".

Manet deliberately abandoned any sense of connection between the figures, treating them more like objects in a still life than living people. None of them looks at the others. One commentator, the caricaturist Cham, sarcastically called for the shutters to be closed. Morisot herself said "French: Je suis plus étrange que laide; il paraît que l'épithète de femme fatale a circulé parmi les curieux, lit. 'I look more peculiar than ugly; it seems that people asking about it have used the words femme fatale to describe me.'" Albert Wolff described it as "coarse art" at "the level of house painters".

He kept the painting until his death in 1883, hanging it near his painting of Olympia. It was bought from the sale of Manet's estate in February 1884 by Gustave Caillebotte, who paid 3,000 francs. Caillebotte displayed it in a prominent position in his house at Gennevilliers. On his death in 1894, Caillebotte's will left the painting, with other works, to the French state. It was displayed at the Musée du Luxembourg from 1896 to 1929, then at the Musée du Louvre until 1986 (from 1947, at the Galerie nationale du Jeu de Paume). It was transferred to the Musée d'Orsay in 1986.

René Magritte painted Perspective II: Manet's Balcony in 1950, a commentary on the work. On the balcony are four coffins (one "seated") in place of the four people. Michel Foucault said of Magritte's painting, "C'est bien cette limite de la vie et de la mort, de la lumière et de l'obscurité, qui est là, manifestée par ces trois personnages" (It is this limit of life and death, of light and darkness, which is there, manifested by these three characters). Magritte told Foucault, "For me the setting of The Balcony offered a suitable place to put coffins. The 'mechanism' at work here might form the object of a learned explanation, which I am unable to provide. The explanation would be valid, indeed beyond question, but that would not make it any less mysterious."

== Manet's Flaneuse: Portrait of Mademoiselle Claus ==
Manet's Portrait of Mademoiselle Claus has been considered a sketch for The Balcony. As a preparatory sketch for the finished product, Mademoiselle Claus' portrait captures the artist's overarching intentions. It is her peering eyes over the balcony that suggest her position as a flaneuse, the feminine equivalent to the flâneur who would have been described at the time as a passante. Nesci (2007) introduces the concept of the flaneuse and positions the existence of this feminine figure as early as the 1830s. By scrutinising the masculine figure of the flaneur and uncovering the figure of the flaneuse, "helps us question the conditions of inclusion and exclusion of public urban life". Both the balcony context of The Balcony and the Portrait depict this question of inclusion and exclusion of public urban life, placing women on a balcony peering onto (and therefore gazing) the public urban life, whilst retaining a close physical proximity with their domestic environment (the inside of the house alluded to by the dark space between the two green windows. This act of gazing onto public urban life and reflecting on it without being a part of it is "central to the definition of the flaneur". Manet's The Balcony and the individual sketches he produced prior to the full composition and therefore examples of what 21st century scholars are unravelling in their scrutiny of the masculine flaneur and uncovering of the existence of a very present flaneuse.

== Gallery ==
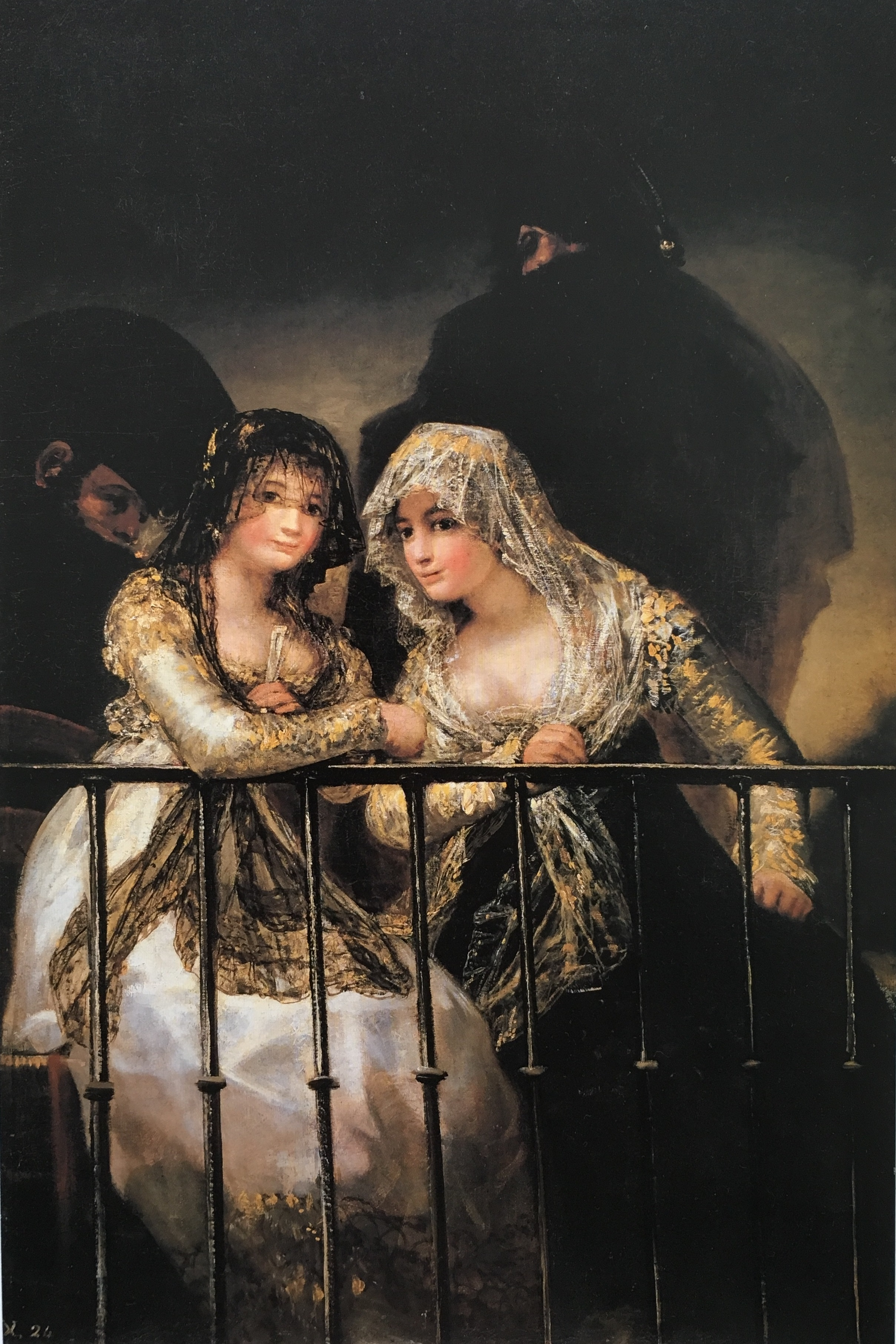
The Majas at the balcony, by Francisco Goya, private collection, Switzerland

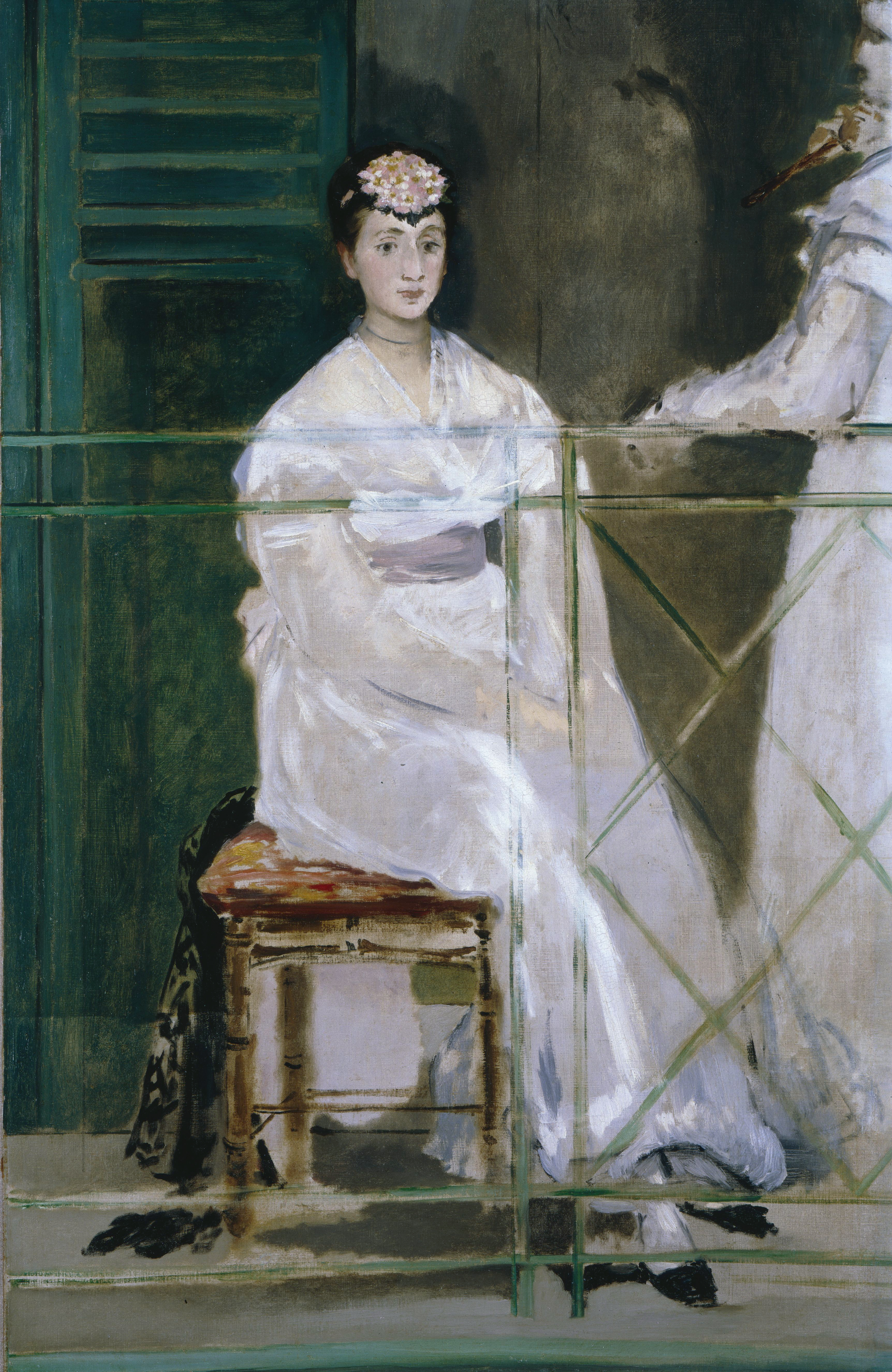
Portrait of Mademoiselle Claus, by Édouard Manet, Ashmolean Museum

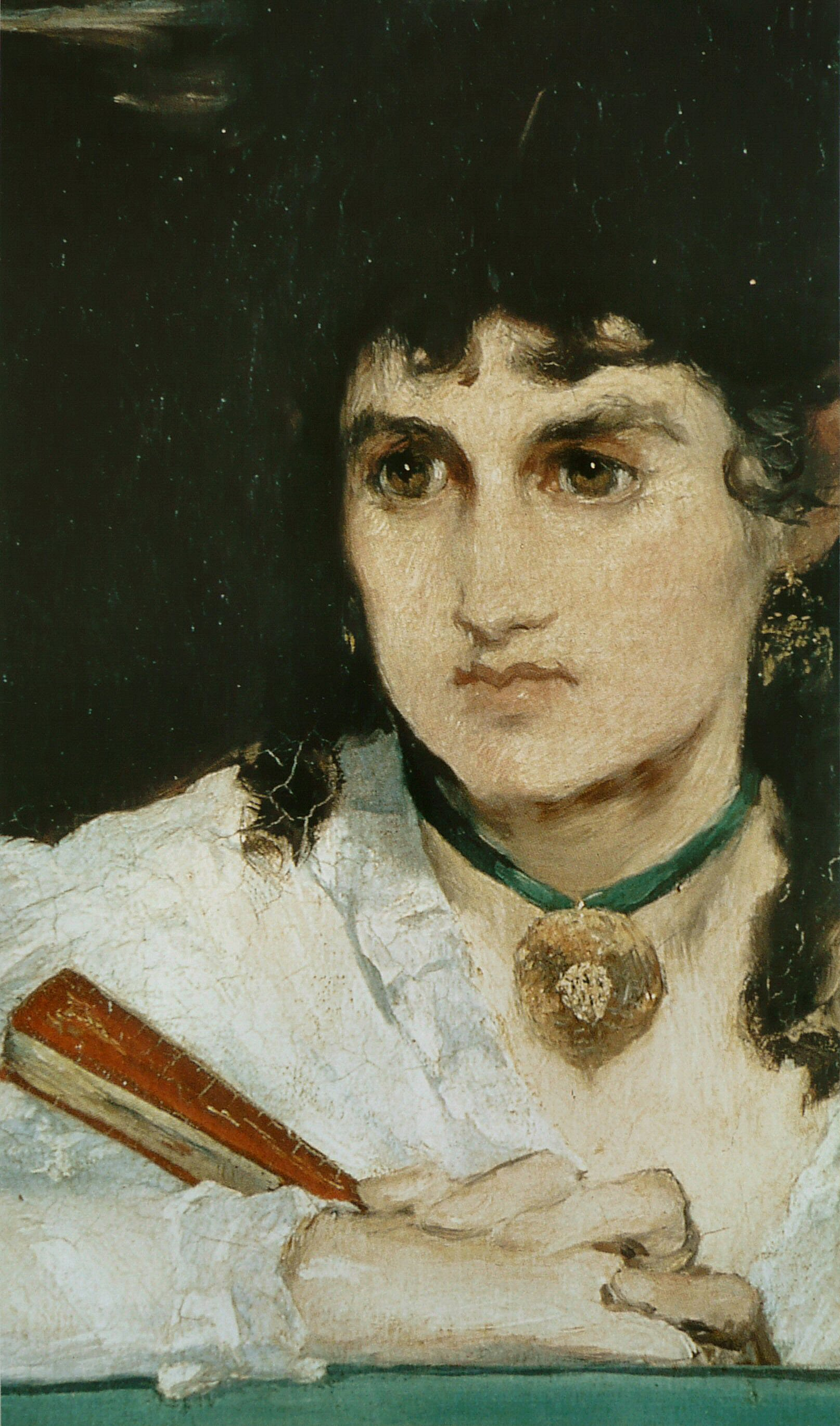
Detail Berthe Morisot

== Appropriations ==
In 1950, René Magritte made a wry diversion of it in which coffins replace the characters: Perspective II, Manet's Balcony.

In 1984, Herman Braun-Vega incorporated The Balcony with Monet's Women in the Garden into an enlarged composition in the foreground of which two poor Peruvian women are seated waiting to sell some vegetable plants piled in front of them. In this painting, titled En attendant (Monet et Manet), Braun-Vega highlights the contrast between the affluence of the North, represented by the Sunday-best figures of Manet and Monet, and the poverty of the South, represented by the Peruvian vegetable sellers.

== See also ==
- List of paintings by Édouard Manet
- 1868 in art
