= Luncheon in the Studio =

Painting by Édouard Manet

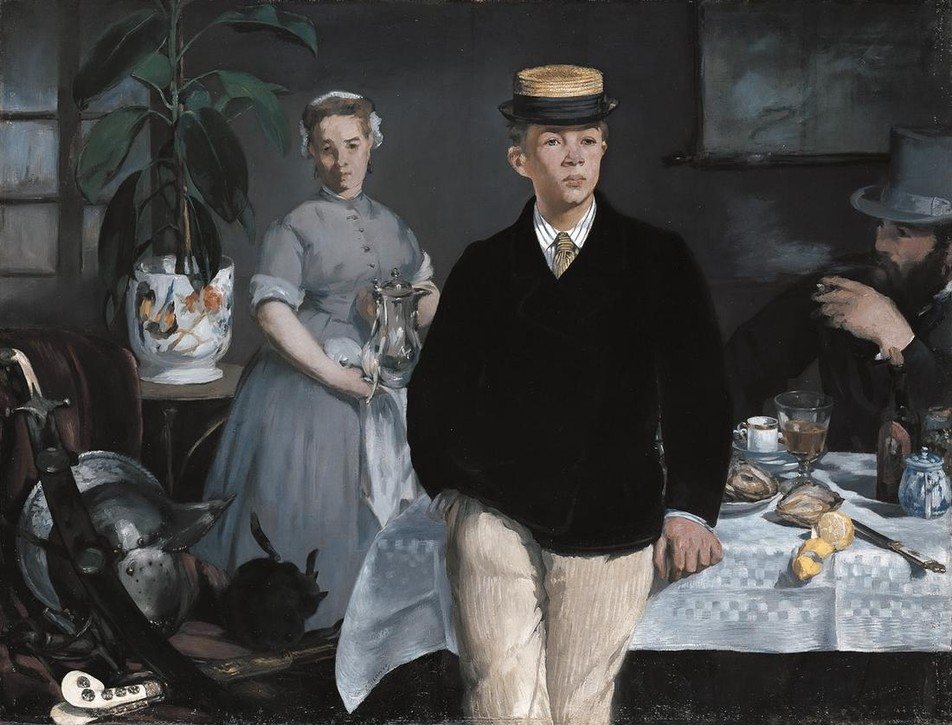
- Artist: Édouard Manet
- Year: 1868
- Medium: Oil on canvas
- Dimensions: 118 cm × 154 cm (46 in × 61 in)
- Location: Neue Pinakothek; Munich

Luncheon in the Studio (or The Luncheon) is an 1868 oil painting by Édouard Manet. Partially a portrait of 16-year-old Léon Leenhoff — the son of Suzanne Leenhoff before her 1863 marriage to Manet, and possibly the son of Manet or Manet's father Auguste — it is also an enigmatic work that has received limited attention within Manet's oeuvre. Critic Nan Stalnaker notes that "despite continued questions about its meaning, the work is acknowledged to be brilliantly painted and a major Manet work".

== Description ==
In the summer of 1868 Manet traveled to Boulogne-sur-Mer for his summer vacation, where he painted Luncheon in the Studio and other works. Luncheon was posed in the dining room of Manet's rented house.

Leenhoff is the focus of the painting, with his back to the other two people, who have at various points been identified as his mother and Manet. These identifications are now seen as incorrect; the man seated at the table, smoking a cigar and enjoying a coffee and a digestif, is anonymous—although he bears a resemblance to Manet (his friend, the painter Auguste Rousselin has also been suggested). The woman gazing toward the viewer is a servant. Given the uncertain status of Leenhoff's paternity, Jeffrey Meyers proposes that the two figures may nevertheless represent Suzanne and Édouard symbolically, specifically "their belated recognition and acceptance of Auguste [Manet]'s son".

In an otherwise muted color scheme, the yellow in Leenhoff's tie, pants, and straw hat connect with the lemon on the table. The armour that appears incongruently in the bottom-left corner recalls its symbolism and collectibility before and during the Second Empire, when it was also the subject of still lifes. The table holds more conventional subjects of the genre, including a peeled lemon, oysters, a Delft sugar bowl, and a knife that protrudes off the table. In this way Manet represents both the "romantic" and "naturalistic" modes of his art, according to Collins, who also notes, given the presence of the man in the background, that smoking was popular among "young romantics".

== Early reception ==
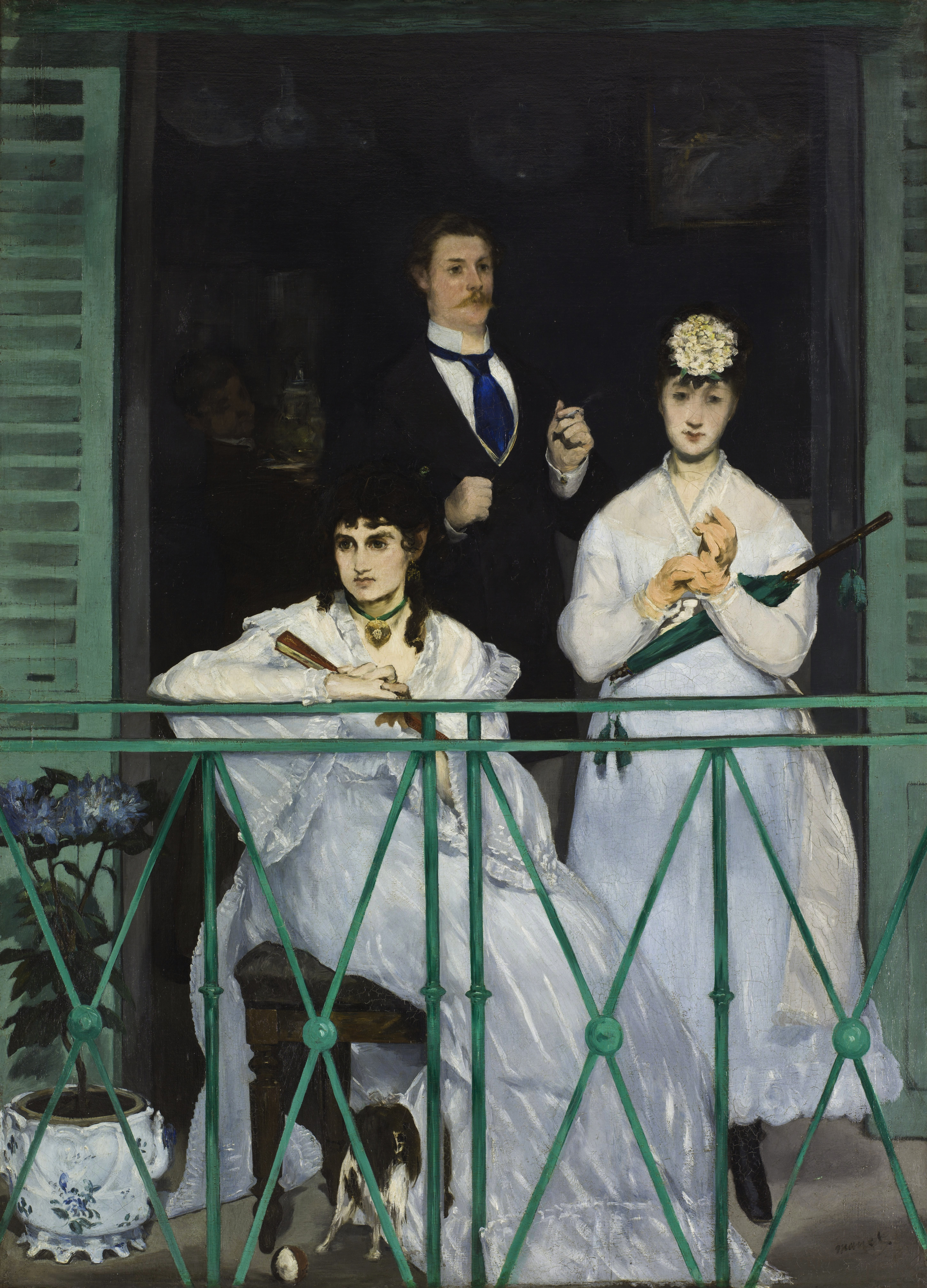
Manet's The Balcony and Luncheon in the Studio were exhibited in the same year. Both were criticized. Leenhoff also appears in this painting, in the dark background.

The painting was exhibited in the 1869 Paris Salon along with Manet's The Balcony, another work that lacked a simple genre affiliation, and in which at least one of the figures seems to confront the viewer as if challenging the "fourth wall". Both pieces were found wanting by art critics of the day; by this time a common criticism of Manet was that his goal was to "attract attention at any price". The reviewer Jules-Antoine Castagnary criticized the two paintings in a quote that well reflects the conventional expectations of a painting in this period, just before the further turbulence that Impressionism brought upon art:

What's the source of [Manet's] sterility? It's that while basing his art on nature, he neglects to make its aim the interpretation of life. He borrows his subjects from poets or takes them from his imagination; he isn't concerned to discover them in living usages. Whence, in his positions, much of their arbitrariness. In the Luncheon, for example, I see on a table where coffee is served a half-peeled lemon and fresh oysters, but these objects don't go together. Why have they been put there then? I know very well why. Because Manet has to the highest extent a feeling for colored patches, because he excels in representing that which is inanimate, and feeling superior in his still lifes, he is naturally inclined to paint them whenever possible... And just as Manet brings together, solely for the pleasure of striking the eyes, still-life elements that belong apart, he also distributes his personages haphazardly, without anything necessary and forced in their composition. Whence the uncertainty and often the obscurity of his thought. What is the young man doing in the Luncheon, seated in the foreground and seeming to look out at the public? True, he is well painted, brushed by a vigorous hand; but where is he? In the dining room? In that case, having his back to the table, he has the wall between him and us, and his position no longer makes any sense... [A] feeling for functions, for appropriateness, is indispensable... Like the personages in a play, it's necessary that every figure in a painting is in its proper plane, fulfills its role, and thereby contributes to the expression of the general idea. Nothing arbitrary and nothing superfluous, that is the law of all artistic composition.

Another critic, Marius Chaumelin, echoed this sentiment (speaking of both paintings): "The personages... are not at all handsome [except for the seated woman in The Balcony, Berthe Morisot], their faces having something morose and disagreeable about them, like the faces of persons who pose, and in fact all these figures have the air of saying to us: Look at me!... Thus, no expression, no feeling, no composition." He spoke of "types without character, scenes devoid of all interest" and said disparagingly (yet insightfully from the point of view of modern criticism) that "Manet had made the portrait of a Balcony and a Luncheon".

== Possible influences ==
Edgar Degas, Achille De Gas in the Uniform of a Cadet (1855)

Meyers finds the depiction of Leenhoff similar in some respects to an 1855 portrait by Edgar Degas of his brother, Achille De Gas in the Uniform of a Cadet. They share the leaning pose, the presence of swords, and facial characteristics. He further suggests that, by borrowing from the Degas work, Manet is hinting that Leenhoff is also his brother (not, as was assumed by all, his son).

Michael Fried sees the influence of the genre scenes of Vermeer, who had recently been "rediscovered" and popularized in France by Théophile Thoré-Bürger. As in Vermeer, the scene captures "arrested action" and involves a servant. The elements of still life on the table "allude unmistakably" to Jean-Baptiste-Siméon Chardin's still life La Raie depouillee (1728); note the oysters and the knife handle jutting off the table, which with the lemon and Delft sugar bowl also recall Dutch still life. Fried mentions that Manet's painting has "possible" allusions to two French paintings from before the turn of the century: Jacques-Louis David's Andromache Mourning Hector (1783; note the armour in the bottom-left corner) and Pierre-Narcisse Guérin's The Return of Marcus Sextus (1799). The black cat on the chair is very likely a reference to Baudelaire, who had died the previous year and was highly identified with cats—calling himself "the poet of cats" in 1853. Collins explains, "Both Baudelaire and Manet were part of a circle of men devoted to the cat as embodiment of their own thoughtful, feminine, and spiritual essence." A black cat also appears in Manet's famous Olympia (1863).

The painting is discussed in Ross King's The Judgment of Paris, where King notes: "In the bottom left of the painting is a medieval helmet and a pair of swords. In many respects it was, like Le dejeuner sur l'herbe, and Olympia, a defiant reworking of artistic tradition... the signatures of masculine bravery became cast-off props in a provincial dining-room, sharing the same dignity and distinction—no more, no less—as the potted plants, corked bottles and coffee urn."

== See also ==
- List of paintings by Édouard Manet
- 1868 in art
