= Jules-Alexandre Grün =

French painter (1868–1938)

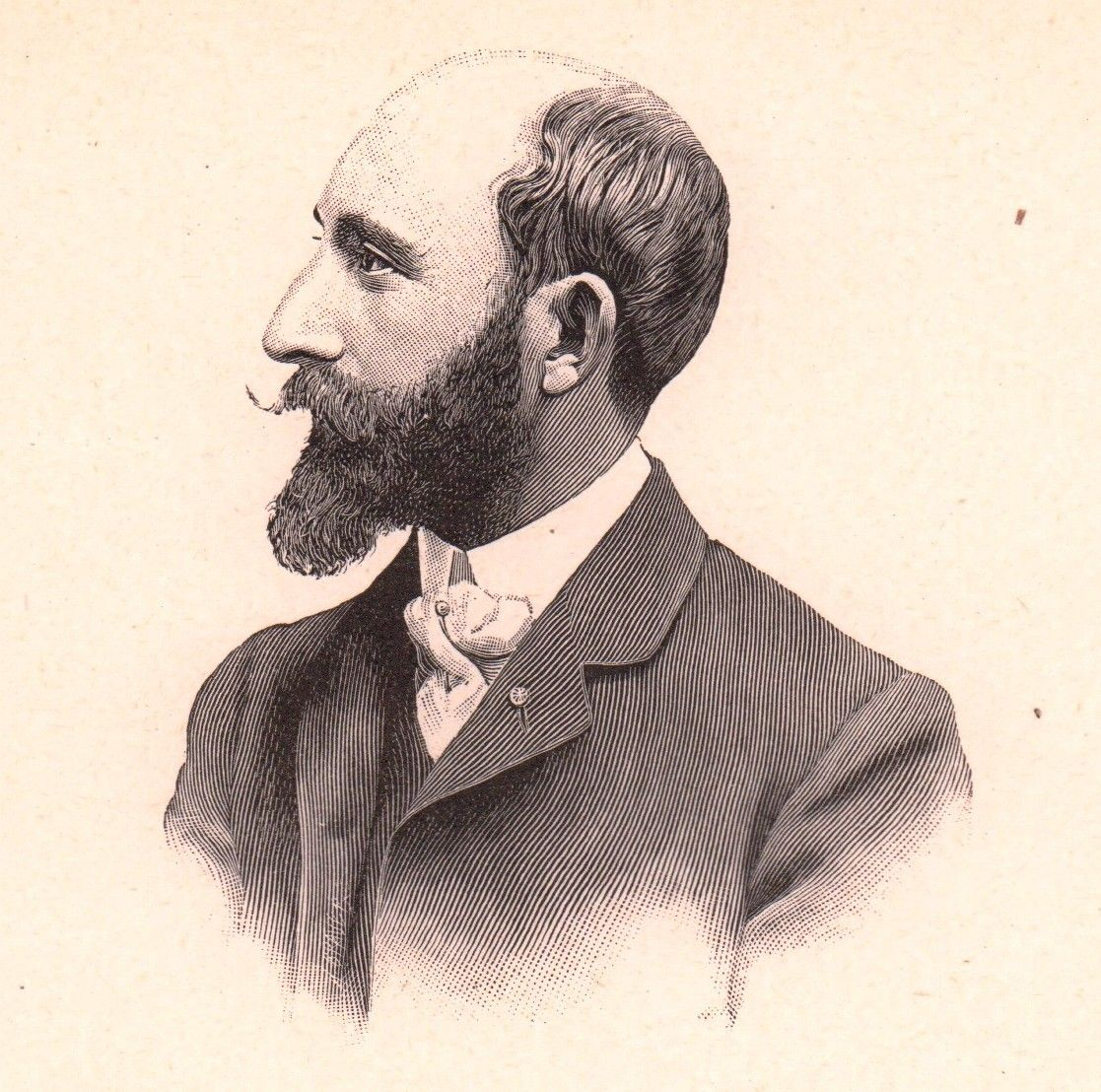
- Born: 25 May 1868; Paris, France
- Died: 15 February 1938 (aged 69); Paris, France
- Education: Antoine Guillemet
- Known for: Painting
- Movement: Post-Impressionism

Jules-Alexandre Grün (25 May 1868 – 15 February 1938) was a French Post-Impressionist painter, poster artist, and illustrator.

Grun's best known painting is called The Dinner Party, produced in 1911. It was made in the fields of poster art and illustration art, for which he was famous. He was employed at a large printing company in Paris and his artistic director was Jules Chéret. Chéret was also his main competitor in poster art.

Posters published in Les Maîtres de l'Affiche

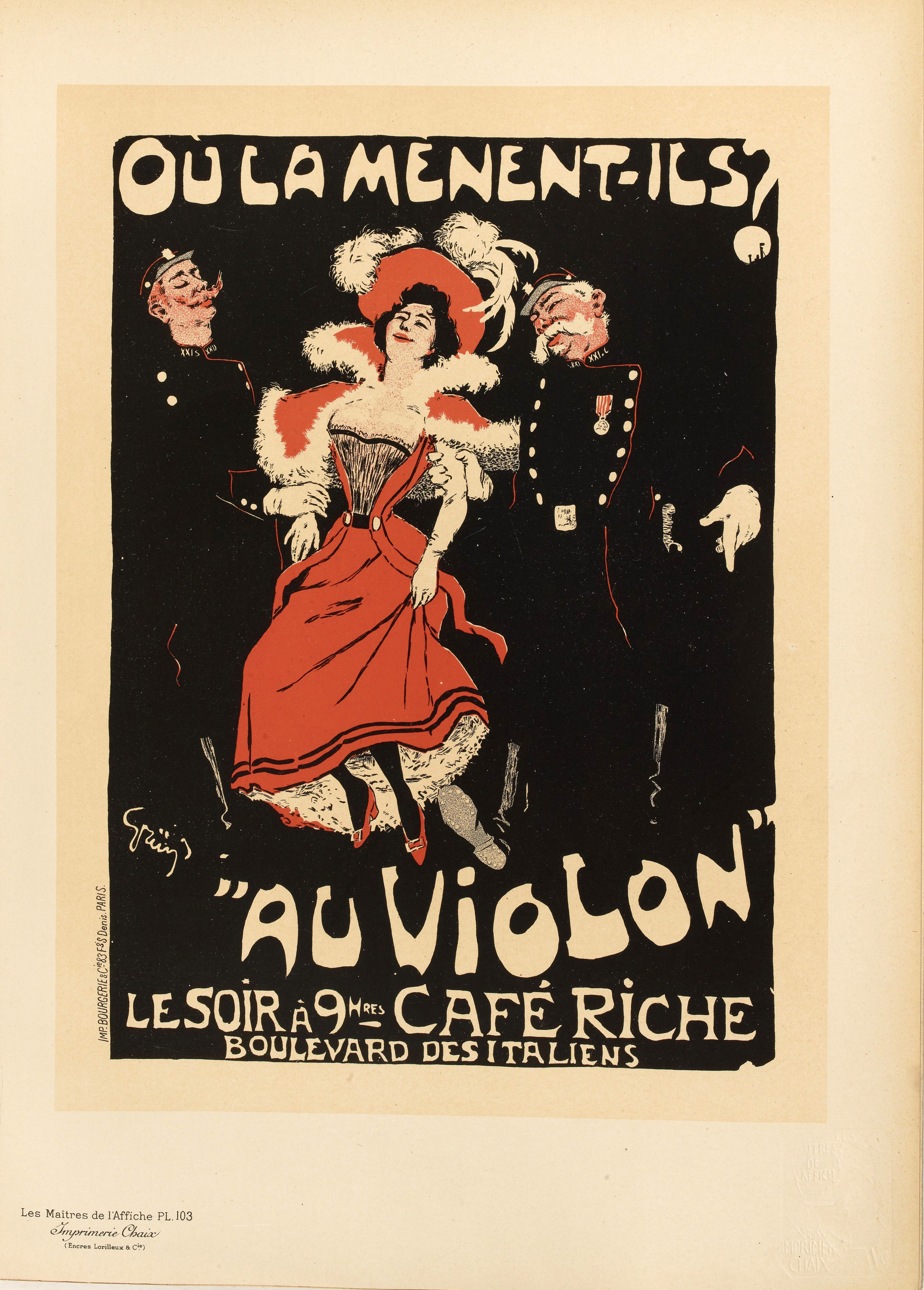
Pl 103

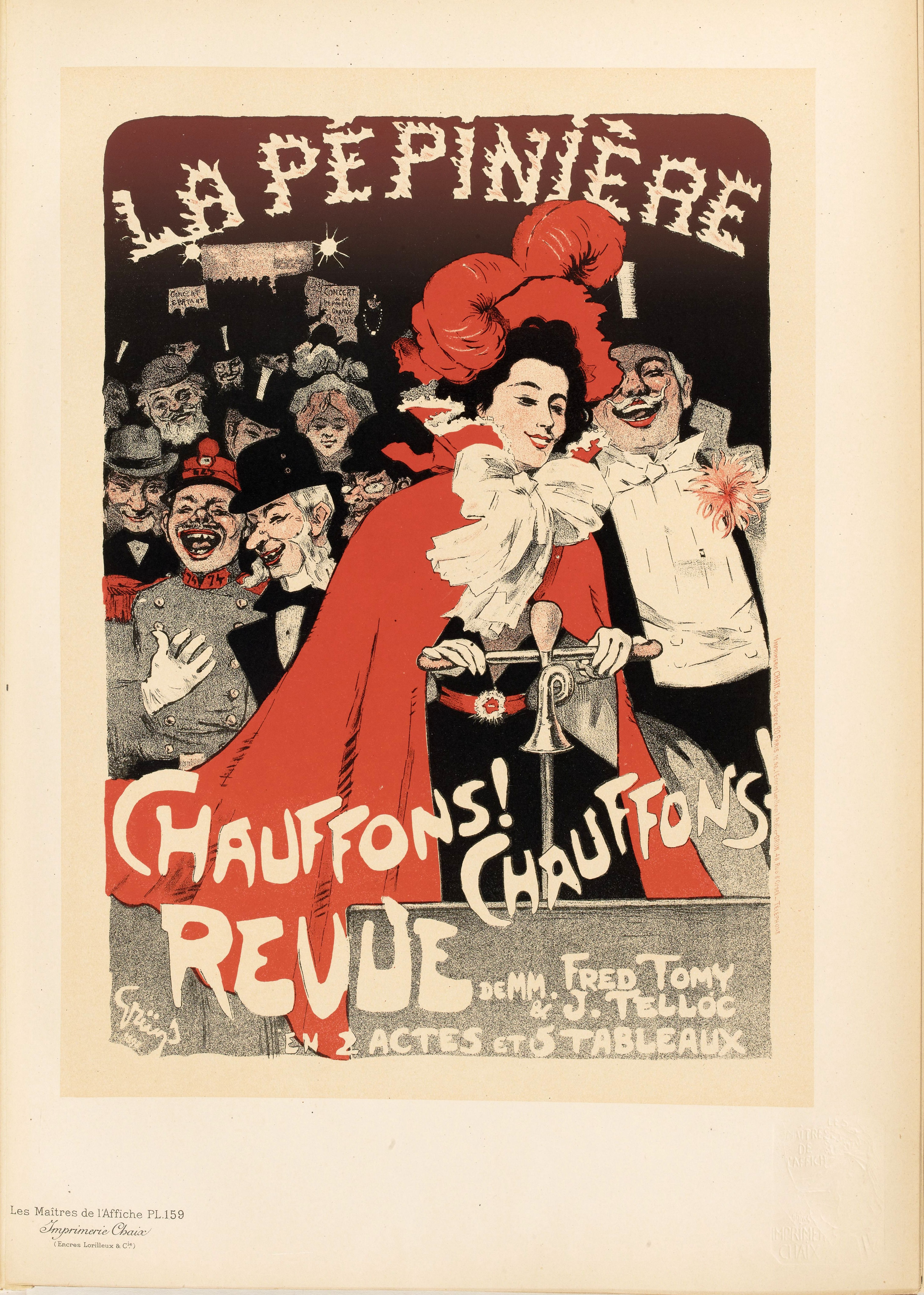
Pl 159

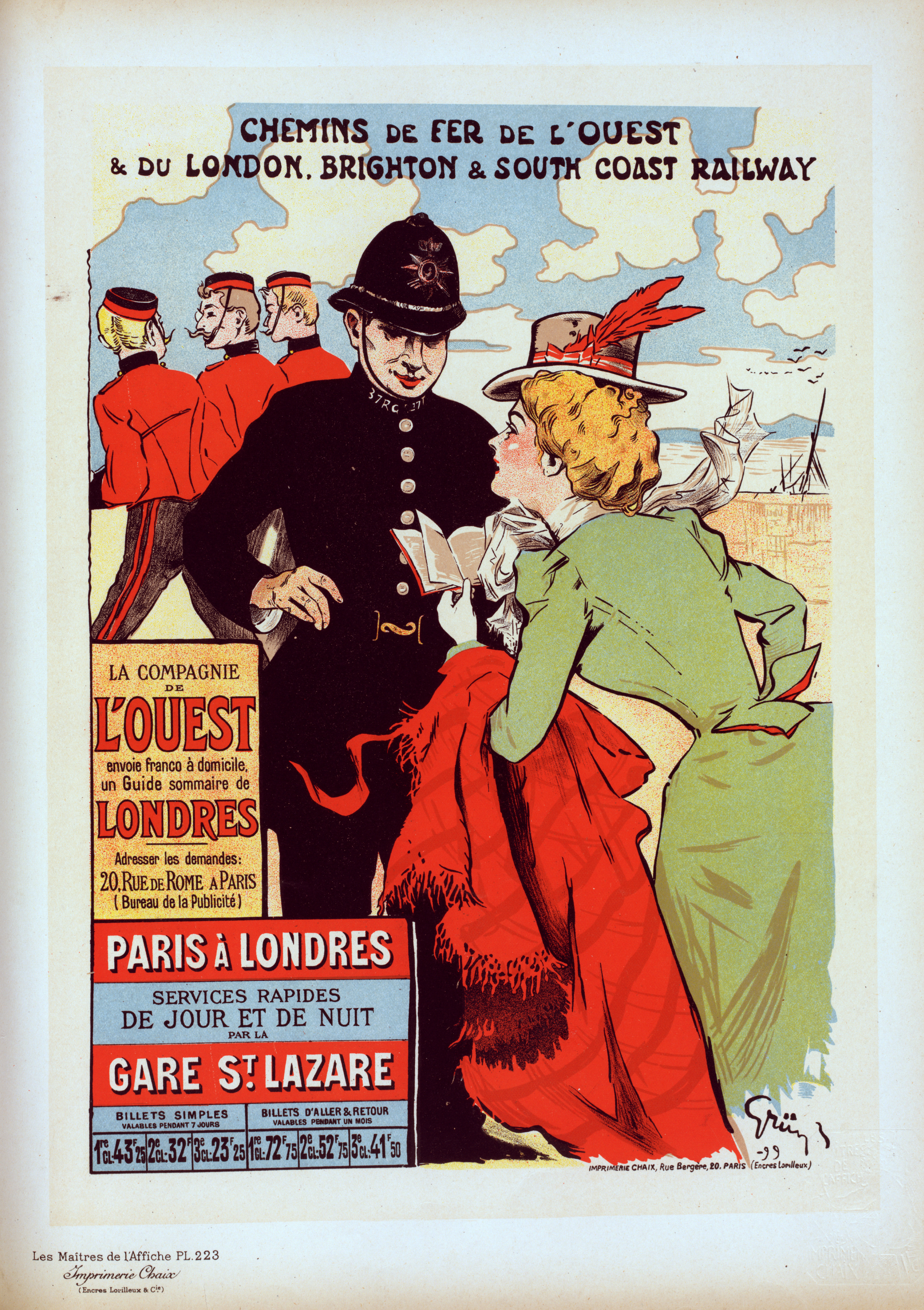
Pl 223

== Gallery ==
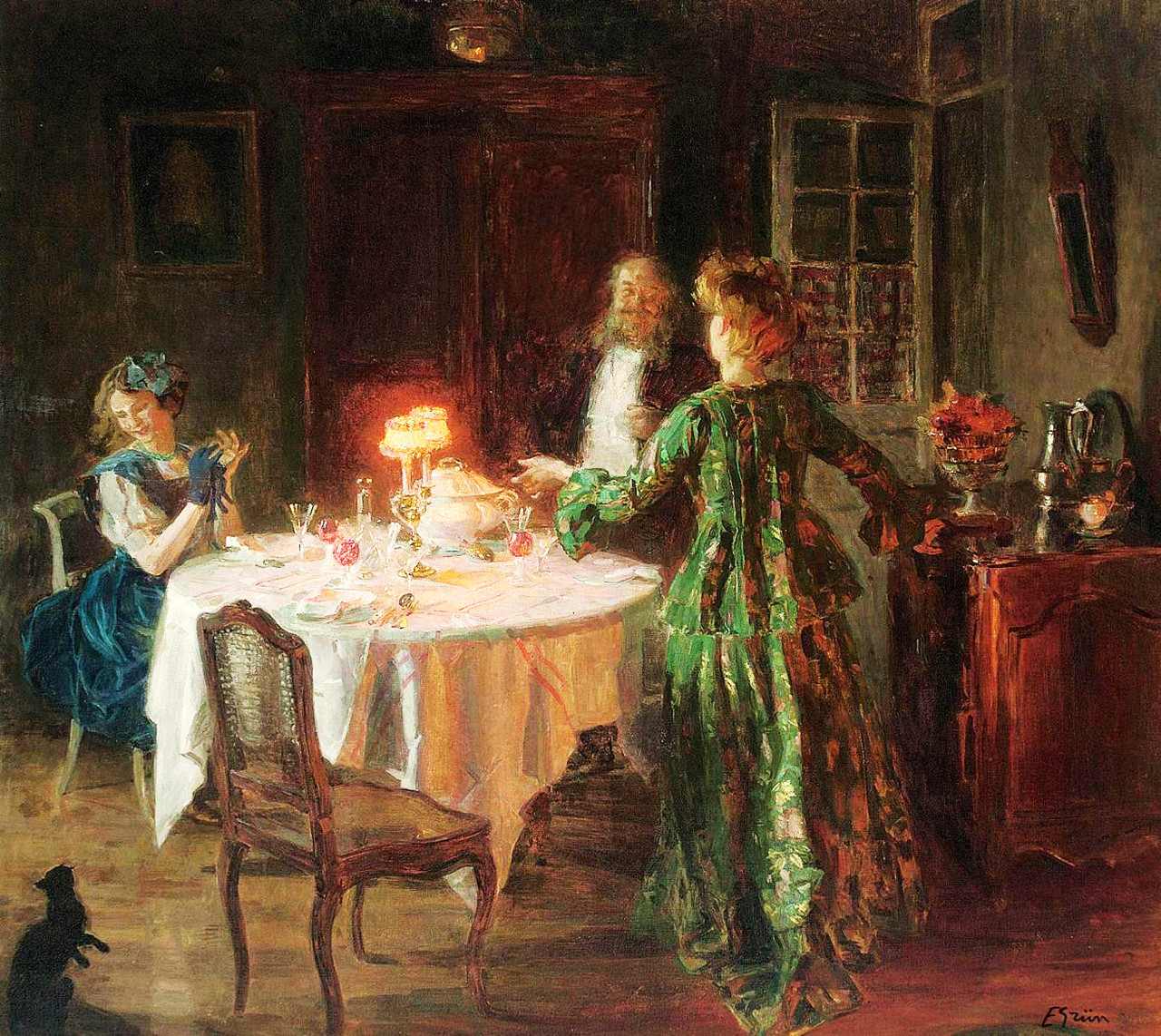

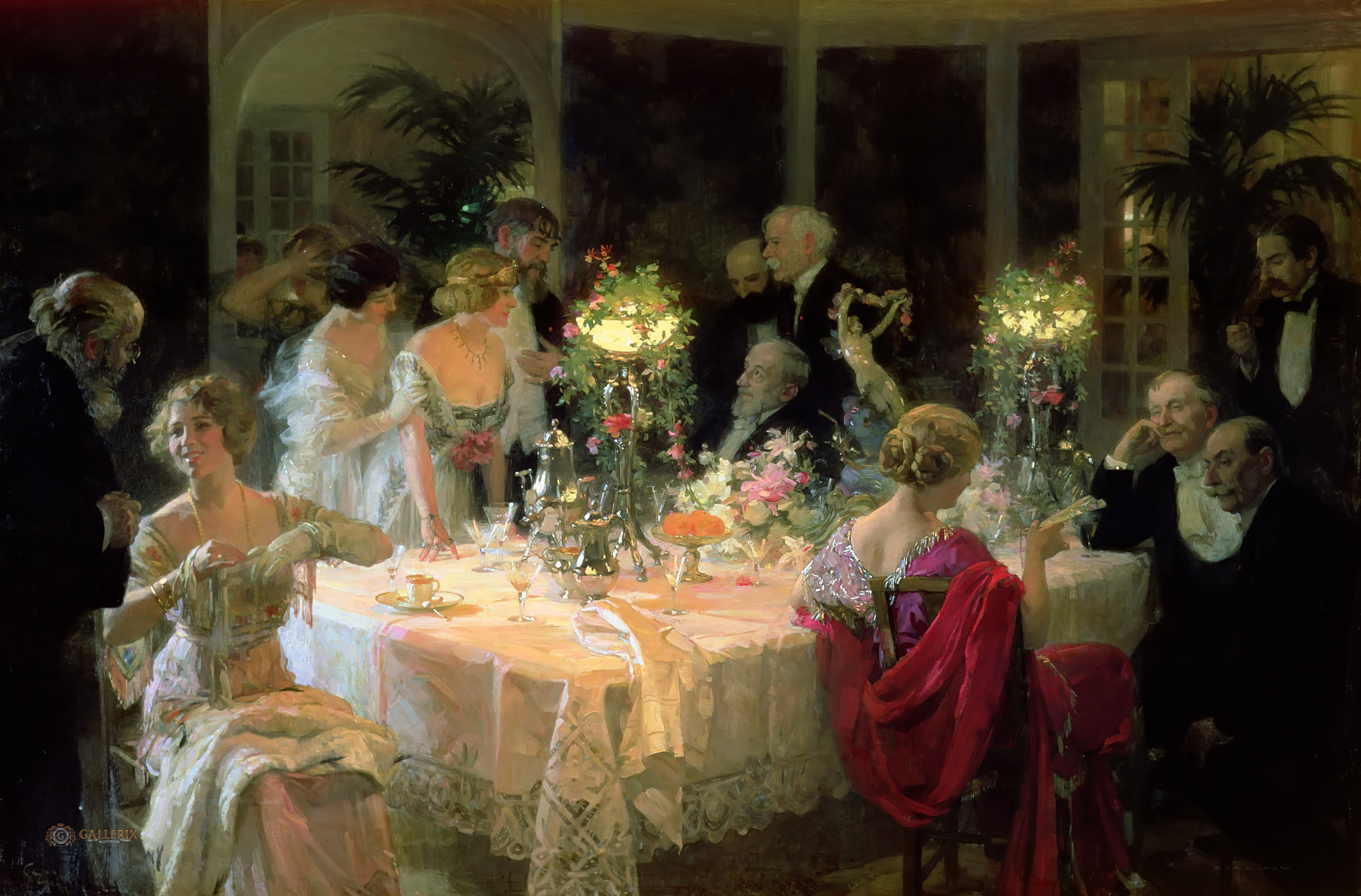
End of supper, 1913

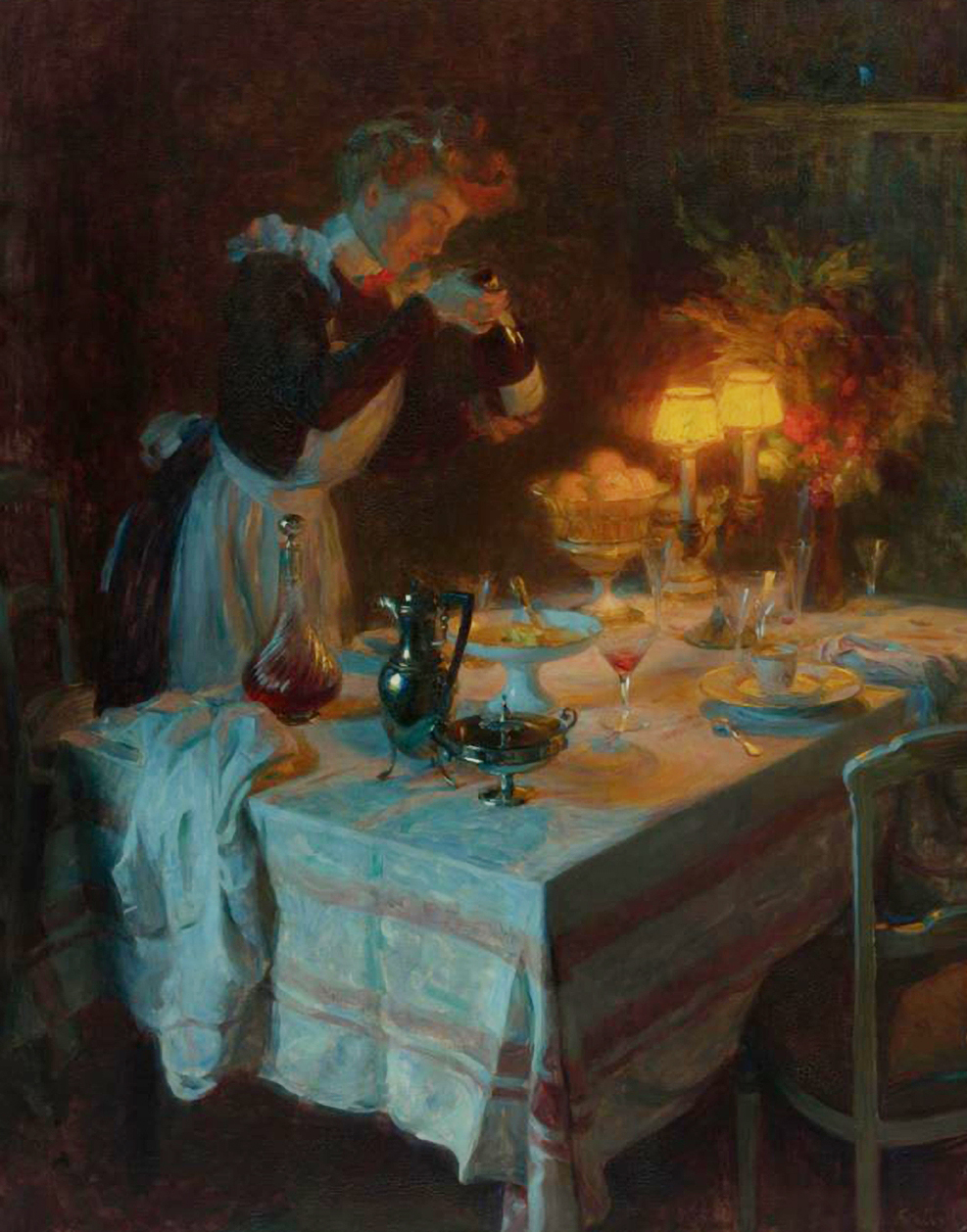

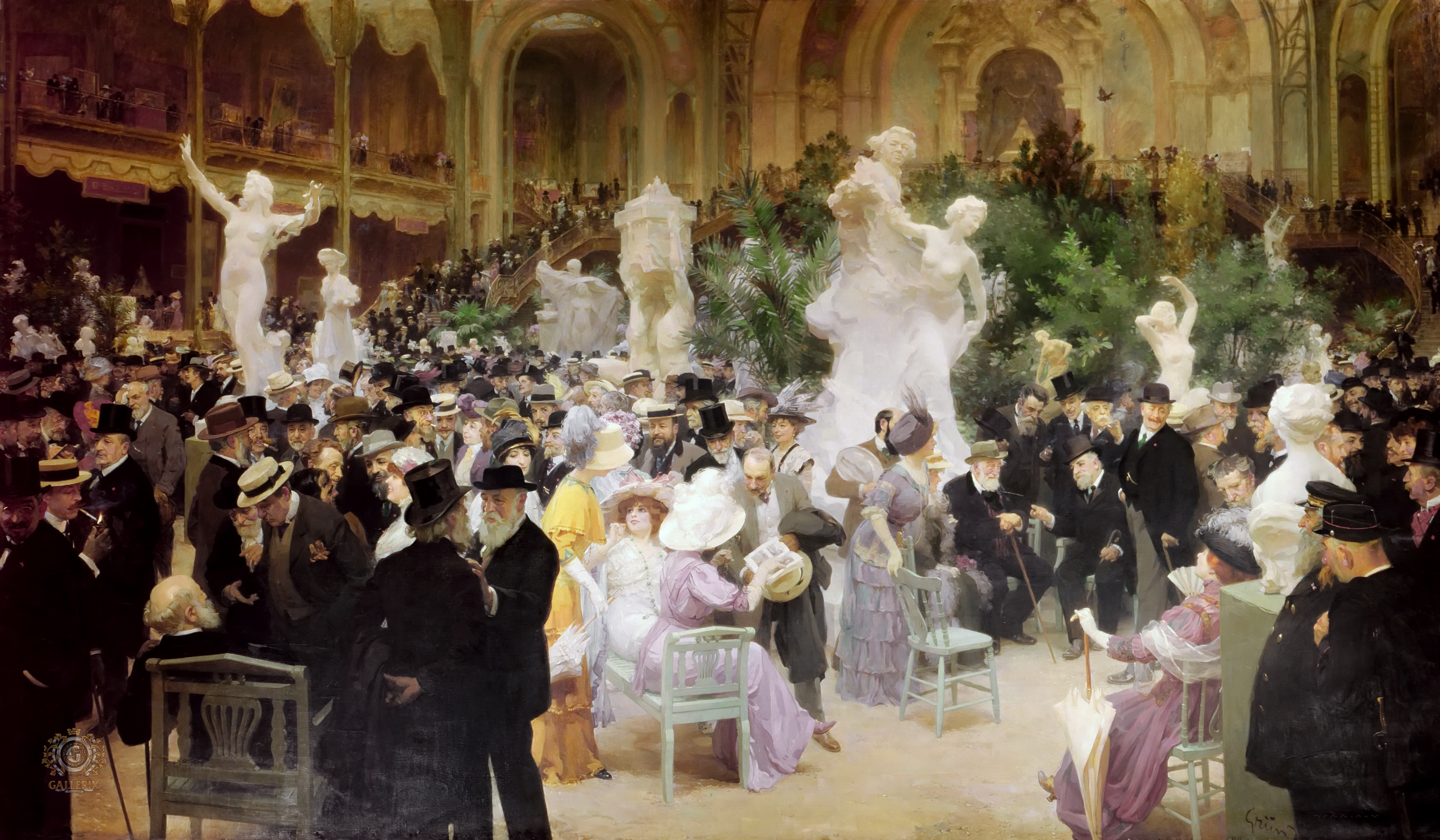
Friday at the French Artists' Salon, 1911

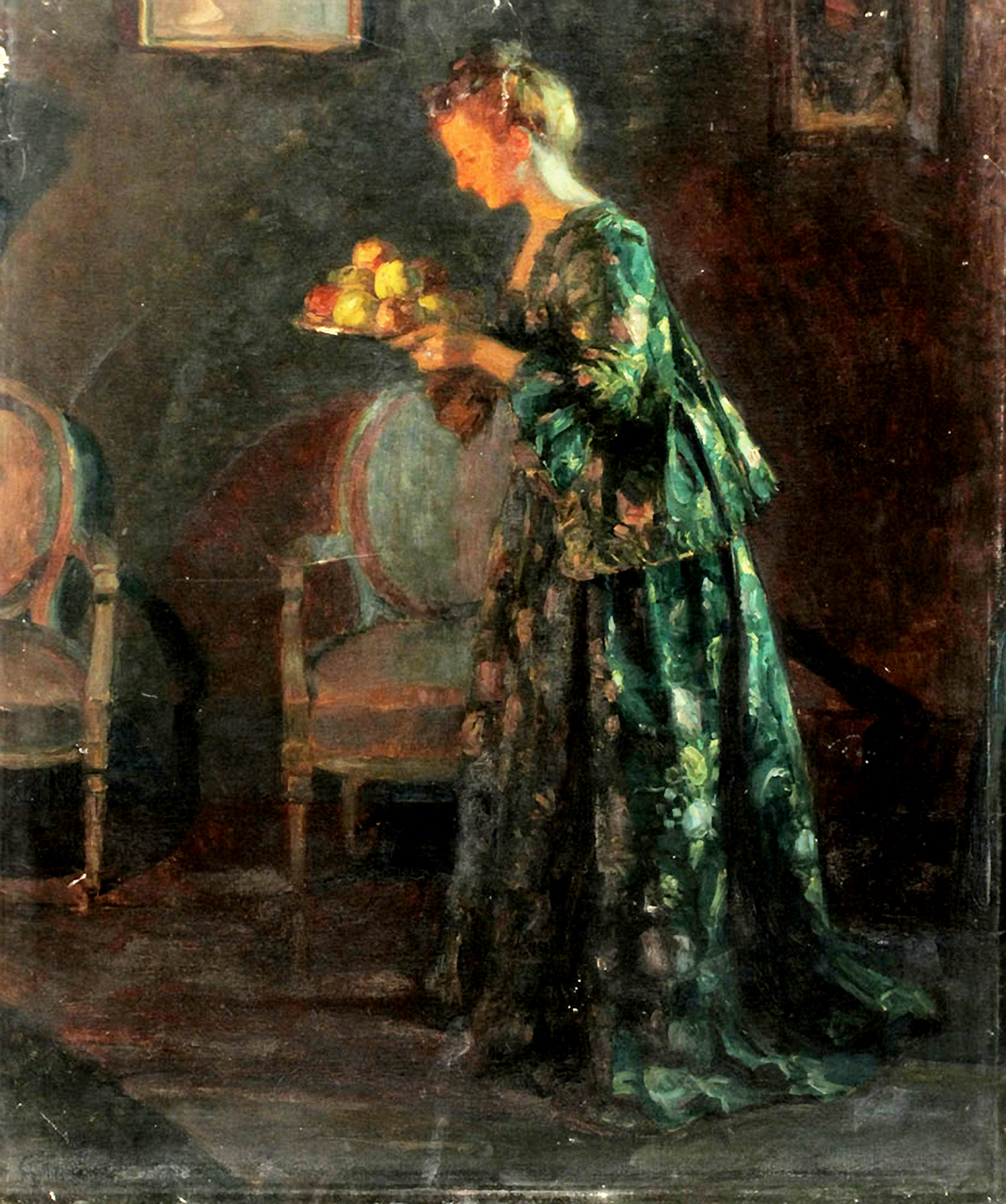

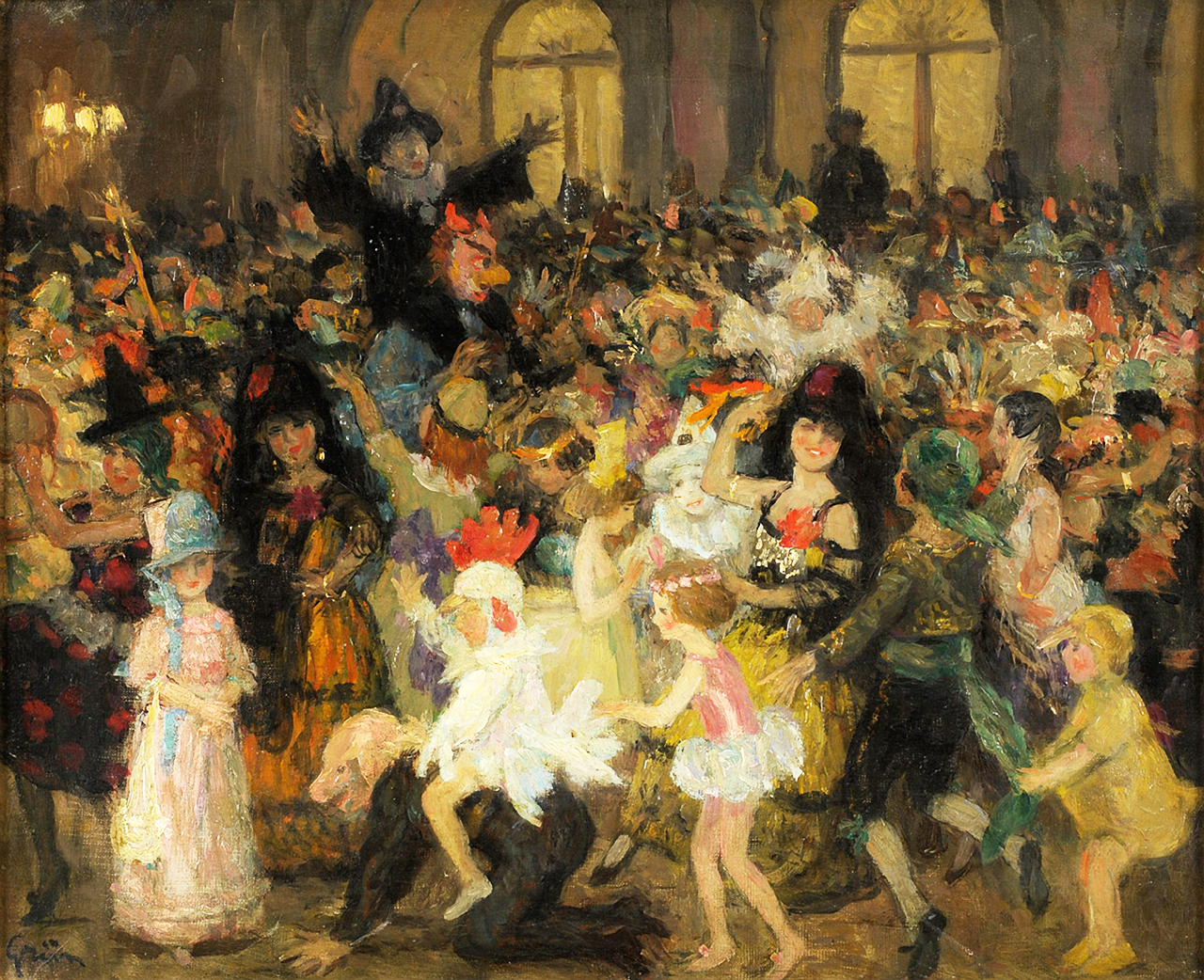

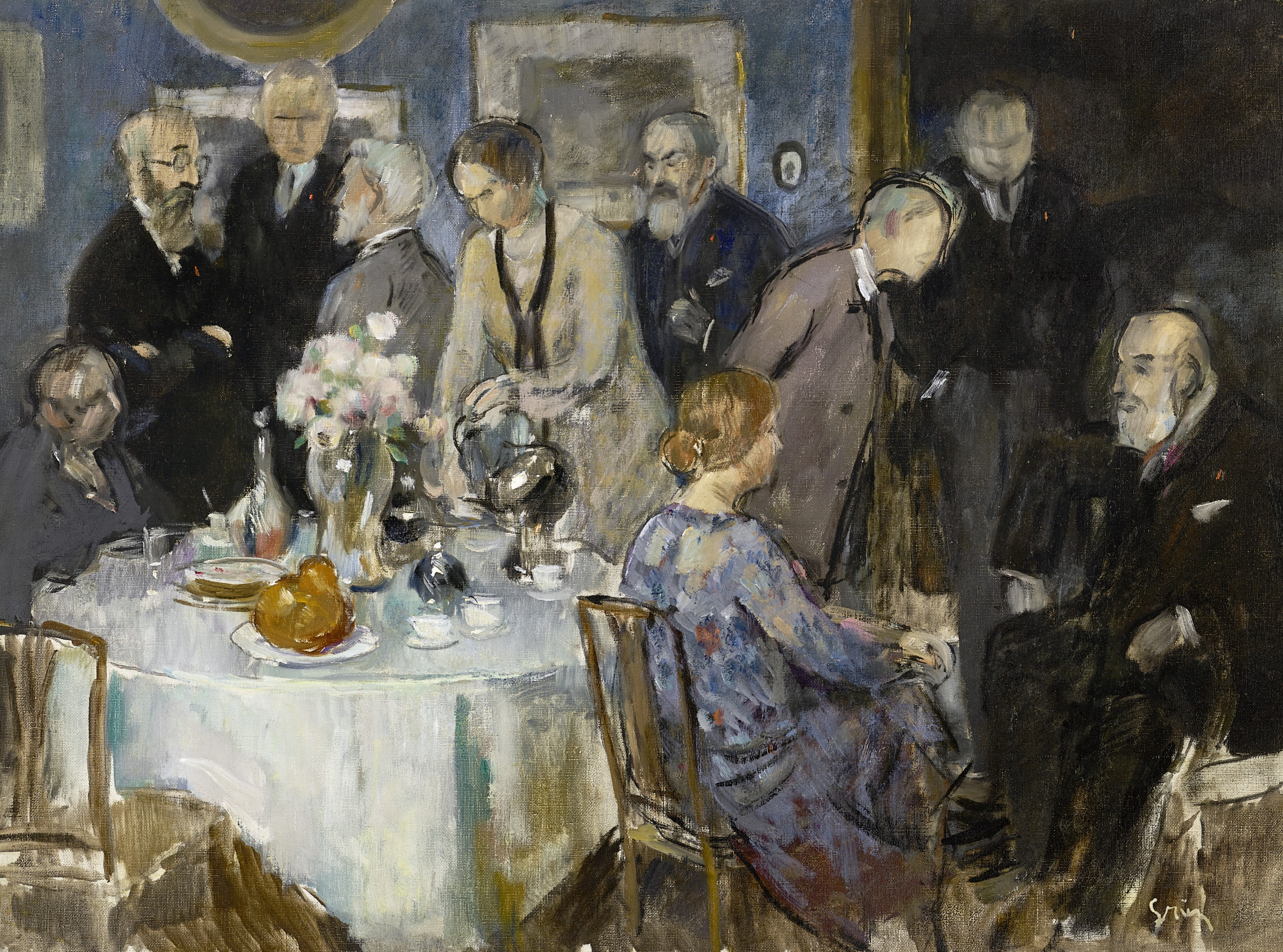
Study for 'A Group of Artists'
