= Ella Gauntt Smith =

Ella Gauntt Smith (née Gauntt, Ella Louise, April 12, 1868 – April 2, 1932) was an innovative American doll manufacturer.

After graduating from LaGrange College in LaGrange, Georgia, and marrying Samuel Swainswright Smith, Ella began working as a seamstress. She spent years repairing broken bisque dolls brought in by her neighbors and experimenting with ways to produce sturdier dolls. She eventually turned to doll manufacturing full-time, selling mostly to friends and neighbors. After experiencing early success, she exhibited her dolls at the 1904 World's Fair in St. Louis, winning a Grand Prize for Innovation and helping establish a nationwide market for her product, and later displayed dolls at the Southeastern Fair in Atlanta, Ga. and at Jamestown Exposition. She received a patent for her design in 1905, in which she described her doll as follows:

“I made the body or trunk, the arms, legs and feet of stuffed fabric and apply over the feet and hands and as high up on the legs and arms as desirable one or more coats of flesh-coloured and preferably water-proof paint. The head, face, neck and bust are also fabric-covered, and the neck or bust is secured to the trunk by suitable stitching. The outer fabric of the face covers and conforms to the curvature of a backing moulded to conform to the contour of the human face. The fabric of the head is stitched up and stretched over a stuffed body, and as a means for making the head rigid a rod or stick may be inserted for making the head and passed down a suitable distance into the trunk or body.

“...if desired, the doll may be provided with a wig. I prefer, however, to produce the appearance of hair by paint applied directly to the fabric of the head, since the paint acts both to stiffen the fabric, and ... to render the head waterproof. The ears are preferably made of stuffed fabric and sewed to the side o the head, after which they are painted.”

From 1899 to 1932 her back-yard factory employed 12 women and produced 8,000-10,000 dolls per year. The dolls, known as Ella Smith dolls or Alabama Babies were also sometimes called "Roanoke Indestructible Dolls" or "Alabama Indestructible Dolls" because of their heavy cotton frame and stout plaster of Paris heads. It was often said that a truck could drive over one of these dolls without damaging it. The price at the time for an Ella Smith doll ranged from $1.15 to $12.15 depending on size, clothing and hair. A tenth of her dolls were painted black to resemble African American girls. She was likely the first manufacturer to market dolls based on people of African descent in the Southern United States.

Smith was known for working with a hymn-singing parrot perched on her shoulder. At a time when she was planning to expand her operation, a train wreck caused the disastrous loss of many orders. At the same time, a lawsuit arising from a bad business deal cost her a large settlement. Mrs. Smith, who suffered from diabetes and kidney disease, died in 1932 and is buried in Cedarwood Cemetery (Roanoke, AL).
