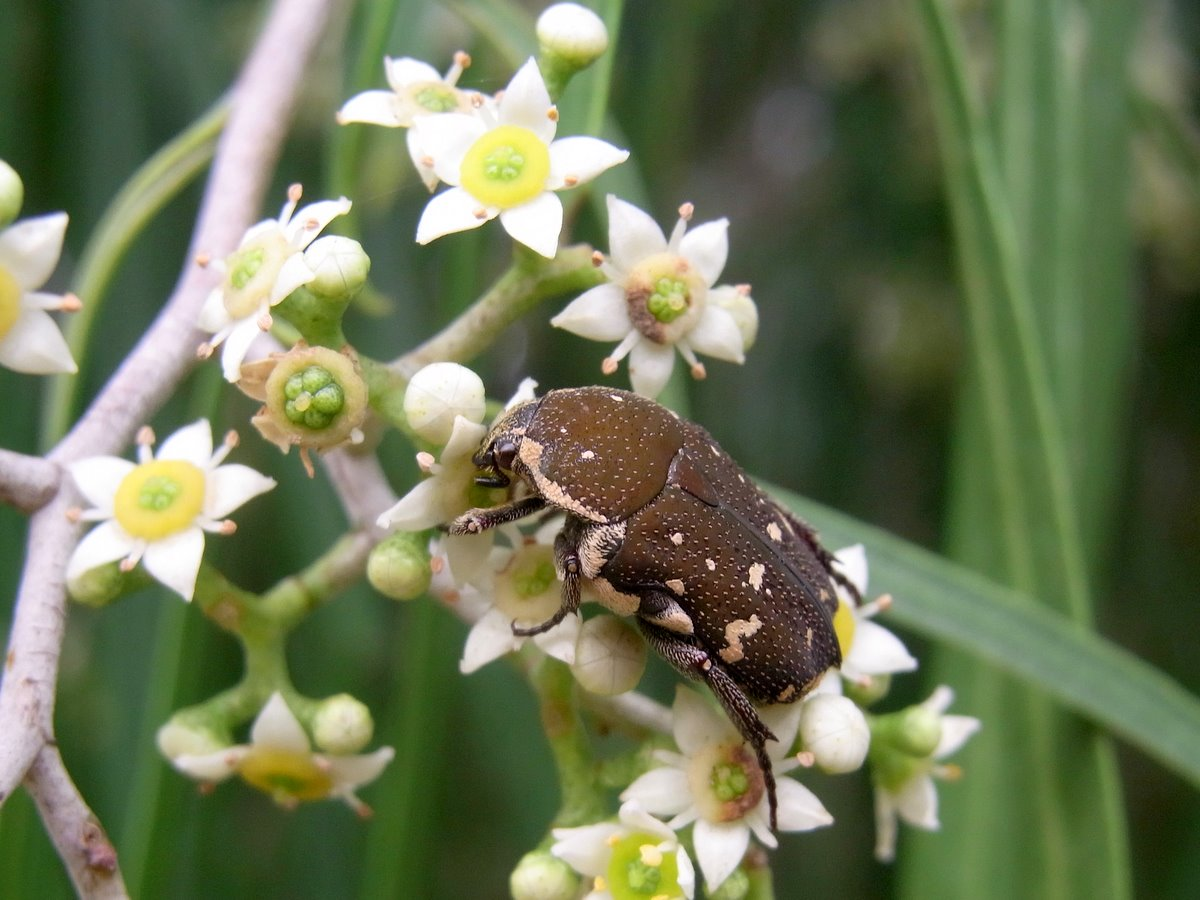
- beetle on a wilga tree

Scientific classification
- Kingdom: Animalia
- Phylum: Arthropoda
- Class: Insecta
- Order: Coleoptera
- Suborder: Polyphaga
- Infraorder: Scarabaeiformia
- Family: Scarabaeidae
- Subfamily: Cetoniinae
- Tribe: Cetoniini
- Subtribe: Cetoniina
- Genus: Glycyphana
- Species: G. Glycyphana

Binomial name
- Glycyphana Glycyphana Fabricius, 1781

= Glycyphana stolata =

Species of beetle

Glycyphana stolata, the brown flower beetle is a species of scarab beetle, found in Australia.
