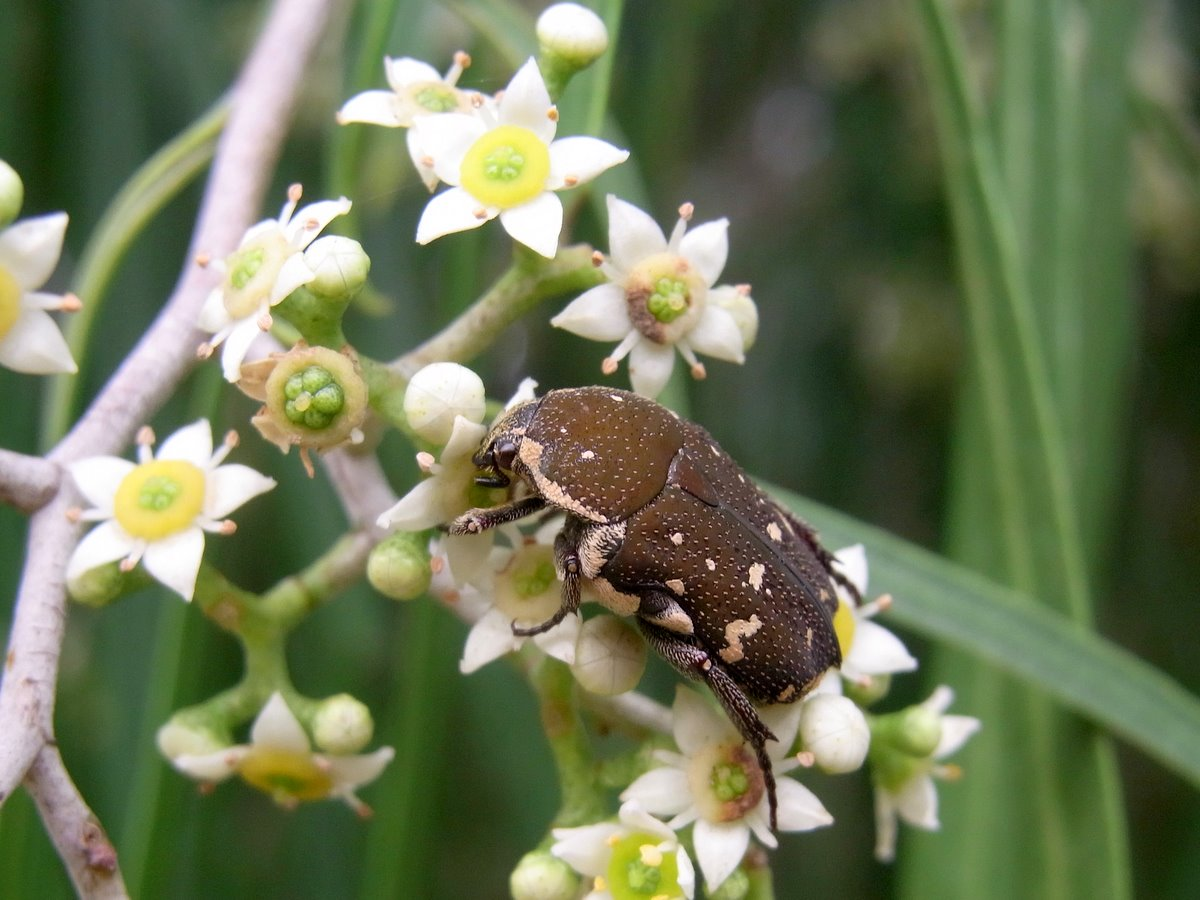
- Glycyphana stolata on a wilga tree

Scientific classification
- Kingdom: Animalia
- Phylum: Arthropoda
- Class: Insecta
- Order: Coleoptera
- Suborder: Polyphaga
- Infraorder: Scarabaeiformia
- Family: Scarabaeidae
- Subfamily: Cetoniinae
- Tribe: Cetoniini
- Subtribe: Cetoniina
- Genus: Glycyphana; Burmeister, 1842

Subgenera
- Caloglycyphana Mikšić, 1968; Euglycyphana Mikšić, 1968; Glycyphana Burmeister, 1842; Glycyphaniola Mikšić, 1968; Heteroglycyphana Mikšić, 1968; Macroglycyphana Mikšić, 1968; Microglycyphana Mikšić, 1968

= Glycyphana =

Genus of beetles

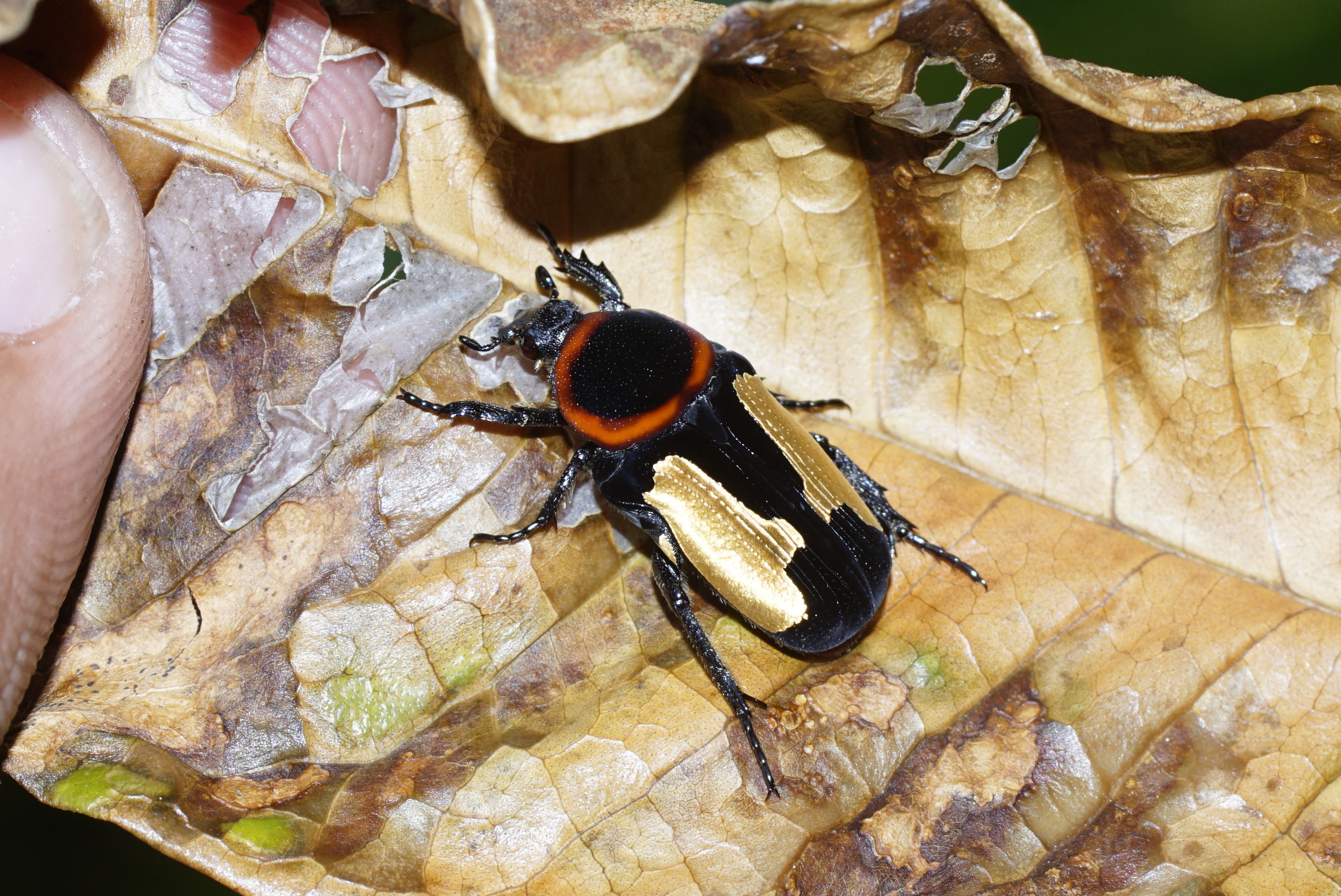
Glycyphana horsfieldi

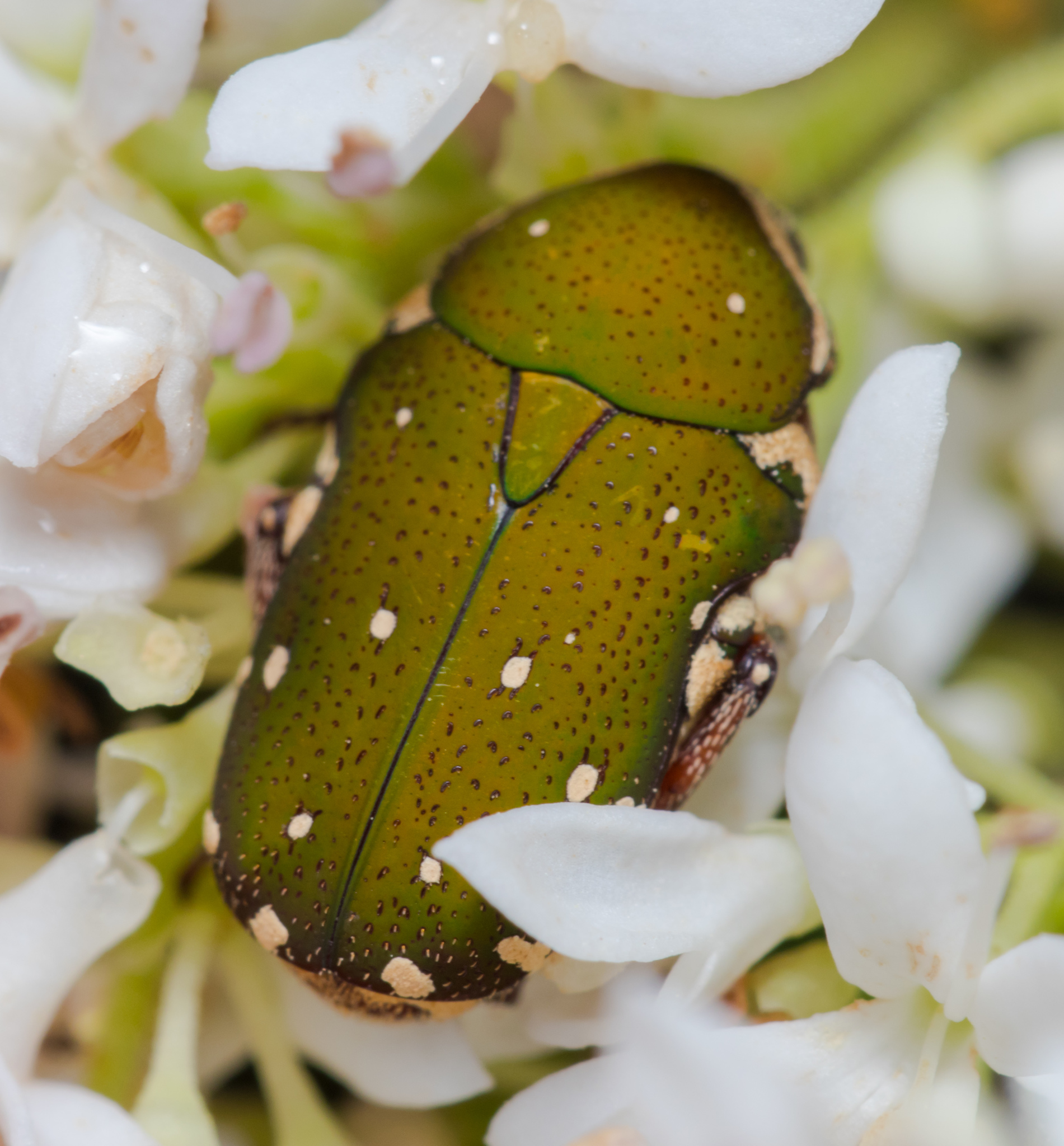
Glycyphana laotica, China

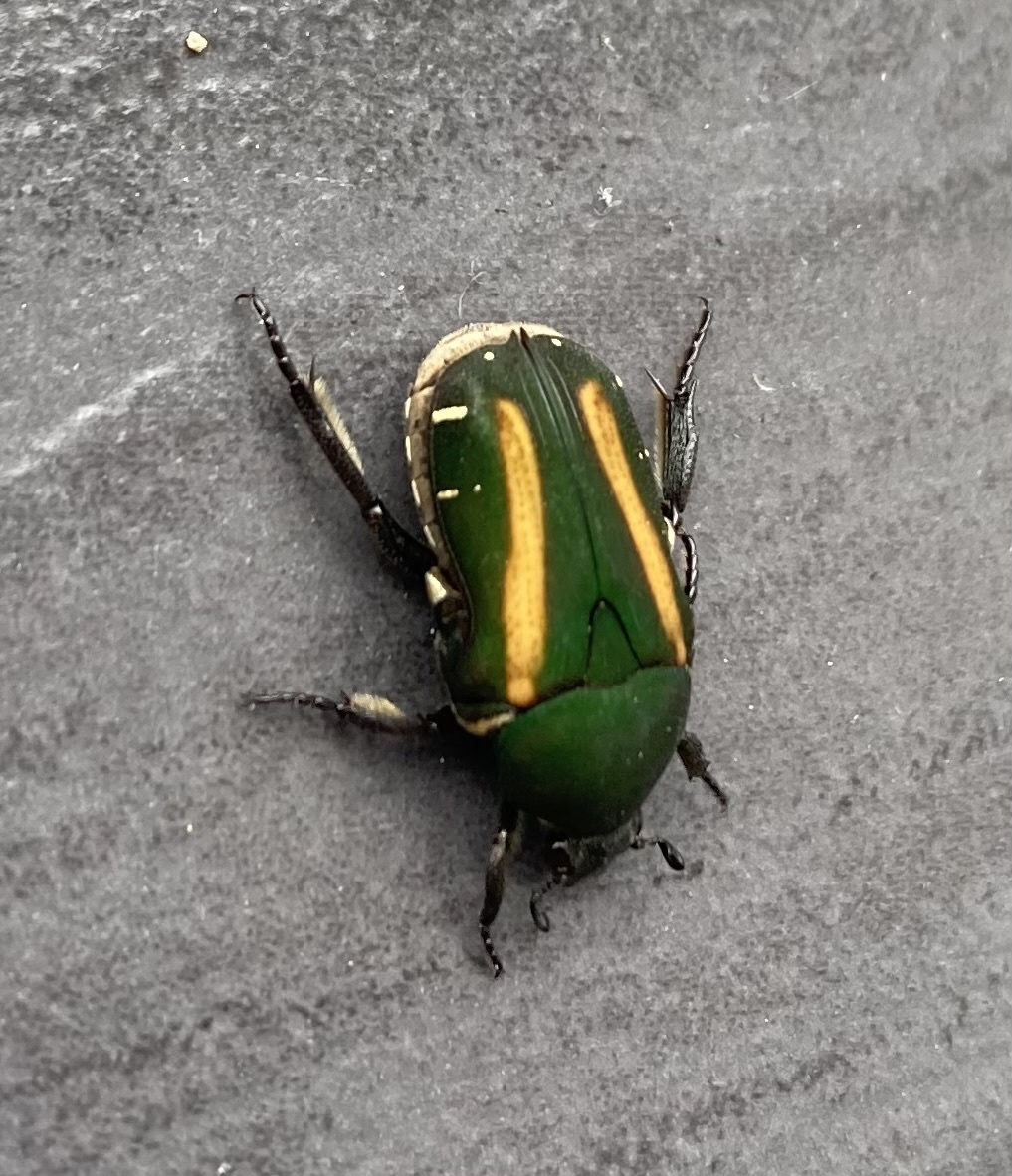
Glycyphana festiva, Malaysia

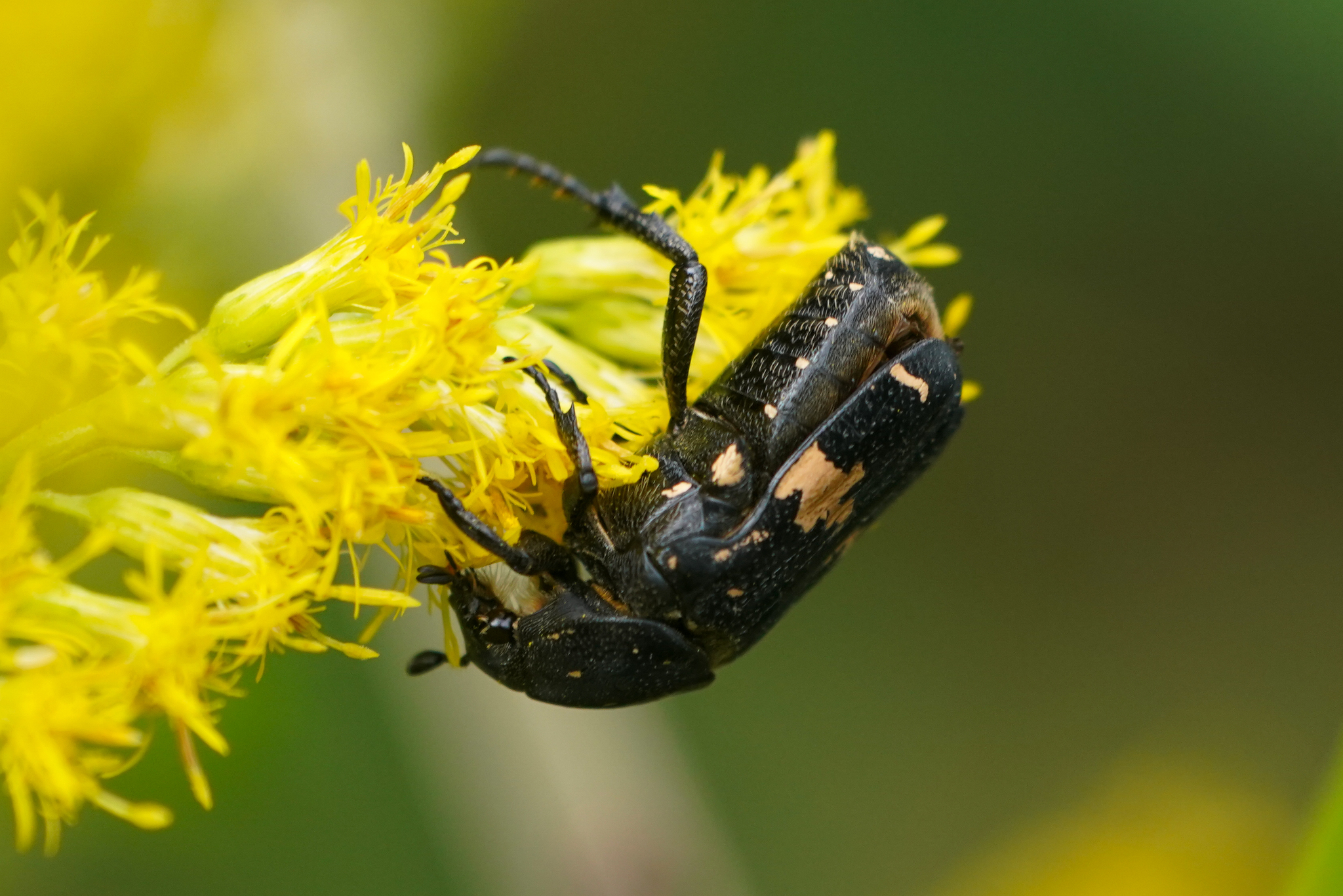
Glycyphana fulvistemma, Japan

Glycyphana is a genus of beetles in the family Scarabaeidae. There are at least 110 described species in Glycyphana, found in Asia, Australia, and the Pacific Islands.

== Species ==
These species belong to the genus Glycyphana:

- Glycyphana aethiessida (Wallace, 1867) (Philippines)
- Glycyphana allardi Antoine, 1992 (Indonesia)
- Glycyphana andamanensis Janson, 1877 (India)
- Glycyphana antoinei Legrand, 2018 (Philippines)
- Glycyphana aspera (Wallace, 1867) (Malaysia)
- Glycyphana aterrima (Wiedemann, 1823) (Indonesia)
- Glycyphana aurocincta Arrow, 1910 (Bhutan, Vietnam)
- Glycyphana aurora Arrow, 1941 (Solomon Islands)
- Glycyphana Australiaa Mikšić, 1971 (Australia)
- Glycyphana bimaculata Kraatz, 1885 (India)
- Glycyphana binotata (Gory & Percheron, 1833)
- Glycyphana bisignata Kraatz, 1885 (Indonesia)
- Glycyphana boudanti Arnaud, 2019 (Philippines)
- Glycyphana brooksi Bacchus, 1974 (Australia)
- Glycyphana brunnipes (Kirby, 1818) (Australia)
- Glycyphana catena Arrow, 1910
- Glycyphana chamnongi Antoine, 1991 (Thailand)
- Glycyphana chewi Antoine & Legrand, 2002 (Malaysia)
- Glycyphana cincta (Wallace, 1867) (Malaysia)
- Glycyphana cretata (Wallace, 1867) (Indonesia)
- Glycyphana cuculus Burmeister, 1842
- Glycyphana darwinensis Bacchus, 1974 (Australia)
- Glycyphana delponti Antoine, 2002 (Philippines)
- Glycyphana enganoensis Mikšić, 1968 (Meok Island)
- Glycyphana fadilae Mikšić, 1967 (Indonesia, Laos, Malaysia, Myanmar, Vietnam)
- Glycyphana festiva (Fabricius, 1792) (Brunei, Indonesia, Malaysia, Thailand)
- Glycyphana florensis Valck Lucassen, 1936 (Indonesia)
- Glycyphana fruhstorferi Schoch, 1897 (Malaysia)
- Glycyphana fulvipicta (Wallace, 1867)
- Glycyphana fulvistemma Motschulsky, 1858 (China, Japan, Korea, Russia, Taiwan)
- Glycyphana georgijevici Mikšić, 1967 (Philippines)
- Glycyphana glauca (Blanchard, 1853) (Indonesia)
- Glycyphana gracilipes Moser, 1914 (Vietnam, China)
- Glycyphana gracilis Sawada, 1942 (temperate Asia)
- Glycyphana harashimai Sakai, 2007 (Palau)
- Glycyphana havai Jákl, 2018 (Indonesia)
- Glycyphana horsfieldi (Hope, 1831)
- Glycyphana hybrida Mikšić, 1970 (Taiwan)
- Glycyphana illusa Janson, 1881 (Indonesia, Malaysia, Thailand)
- Glycyphana immaculata Moser, 1925 (Philippines)
- Glycyphana inusta Mohnike, 1871
- Glycyphana irianica Mikšić, 1982 (Indonesia)
- Glycyphana landini Mikšić, 1968 (Australia)
- Glycyphana laotica Mikšić, 1968 (Laos, Myanmar, Thailand, China)
- Glycyphana lasciva (Thomson, 1857)
- Glycyphana lateralis (Wallace, 1867)
- Glycyphana leucogastra Mikšić, 1967 (Malaysia)
- Glycyphana lombokiana Schoch, 1897
- Glycyphana luzonica Moser, 1917
- Glycyphana macquarti (Gory & Percheron, 1833)
- Glycyphana maculiceps Moser, 1914
- Glycyphana maculipennis Moser, 1914 (Indonesia)
- Glycyphana malayensis (Guérin-Méneville, 1840)
- Glycyphana mediata Westwood, 1874 (Borneo)
- Glycyphana melanaria Kraatz, 1885 (Indonesia)
- Glycyphana meridionalis Jákl, 2023 (Vietnam)
- Glycyphana miksici Antoine & Legrand, 2002 (Indonesia)
- Glycyphana minima Bates, 1891 (Indonesia, Malaysia, India)
- Glycyphana mirei Antoine, 1996 (Vanuatu)
- Glycyphana modesta (Fabricius, 1792) (Indonesia, Malaysia)
- Glycyphana moellendorfi Flach, 1890 (Papua New Guinea)
- Glycyphana mohagani Legrand, 2004 (Philippines)
- Glycyphana moluccarum (Wallace, 1867) (Indonesia)
- Glycyphana nasalis Boheman, 1858 (China)
- Glycyphana neglecta Moser, 1914 (Indonesia)
- Glycyphana nepalensis Kraatz, 1894 (China, India, Nepal, Laos, Myanmar, Thailand, Vietnam)
- Glycyphana nicobarica Janson, 1877 (India, Thailand, China)
- Glycyphana nigra Mikšić, 1986 (Philippines)
- Glycyphana nigricollis Moser, 1908 (Indonesia, Malaysia)
- Glycyphana papua (Wallace, 1867)
- Glycyphana parvula Moser, 1914 (Indonesia, Malaysia)
- Glycyphana penanga (Wallace, 1867) (Borneo, Indonesia, Malaysia)
- Glycyphana peterseni Mikšić, 1970 (Solomon Islands)
- Glycyphana petrovitzi Mikšić, 1968 (Philippines)
- Glycyphana pretiosa Mikšić, 1970 (Indonesia)
- Glycyphana pseudoaruensis Mikšić, 1968 (Indonesia)
- Glycyphana pseudofasciata Valck Lucassen, 1936 (Indonesia)
- Glycyphana pulcherrima Mohnike, 1873 (Philippines)
- Glycyphana pulchra
- Glycyphana pusilla Bacchus, 1974 (Australia)
- Glycyphana pygmaea Mohnike, 1871 (Indonesia, Laos, Malaysia, Myanmar, Thailand, Vietnam)
- Glycyphana quadricolor (Wiedemann, 1823)
- Glycyphana quadriguttata (Snellen Van Vollenhoven, 1864) (Indonesia)
- Glycyphana quadrinotata Moser, 1912 (Papua New Guinea)
- Glycyphana reischigi Krajčik, 2009 (China)
- Glycyphana rubromarginata Mohnike, 1873
- Glycyphana rubroplagiata Moser, 1922 (Philippines)
- Glycyphana rufitincta (MacLeay, 1886) (Papua New Guinea)
- Glycyphana rufovittata (Guérin-Méneville, 1840) (Borneo, Malaysia)
- Glycyphana rugipennis Ritsema, 1879 (Indonesia)
- Glycyphana sarawakensis Moser, 1914 (Malaysia)
- Glycyphana setifera Moser, 1914 (Indonesia)
- Glycyphana siberutensis Antoine & Legrand, 2002 (Indonesia)
- Glycyphana steveni Antoine & Legrand, 2002 (Malaysia)
- Glycyphana stolata (Fabricius, 1781) (Tahiti, New Caledonia, Australia) (brown flower beetle)
- Glycyphana subcincta Janson, 1881 (India)
- Glycyphana sumbana Jákl, 2009 (Indonesia)
- Glycyphana tambora Jákl, 2009 (Indonesia)
- Glycyphana tibialis Moser, 1913 (Solomon Islands)
- Glycyphana tonkinensis Moser, 1914
- Glycyphana torquata (Fabricius, 1801) (India, Myanmar)
- Glycyphana toxopei Moser, 1926 (Indonesia)
- Glycyphana trivittata (Wallace, 1867) (Indonesia)
- Glycyphana unimaculata Paulian, 1960 (Vietnam)
- Glycyphana varicorensis Burmeister, 1842
- Glycyphana velutina MacLeay, 1886 (Papua New Guinea)
- Glycyphana vernalis (Wallace, 1867) (Philippines)
- Glycyphana viridiceps Moser, 1914 (Key Islands, Dammer Island)
- Glycyphana wallacei Jákl, 2017 (Indonesia)
- Glycyphana widagdoi Antoine & Legrand, 2002 (Indonesia)
