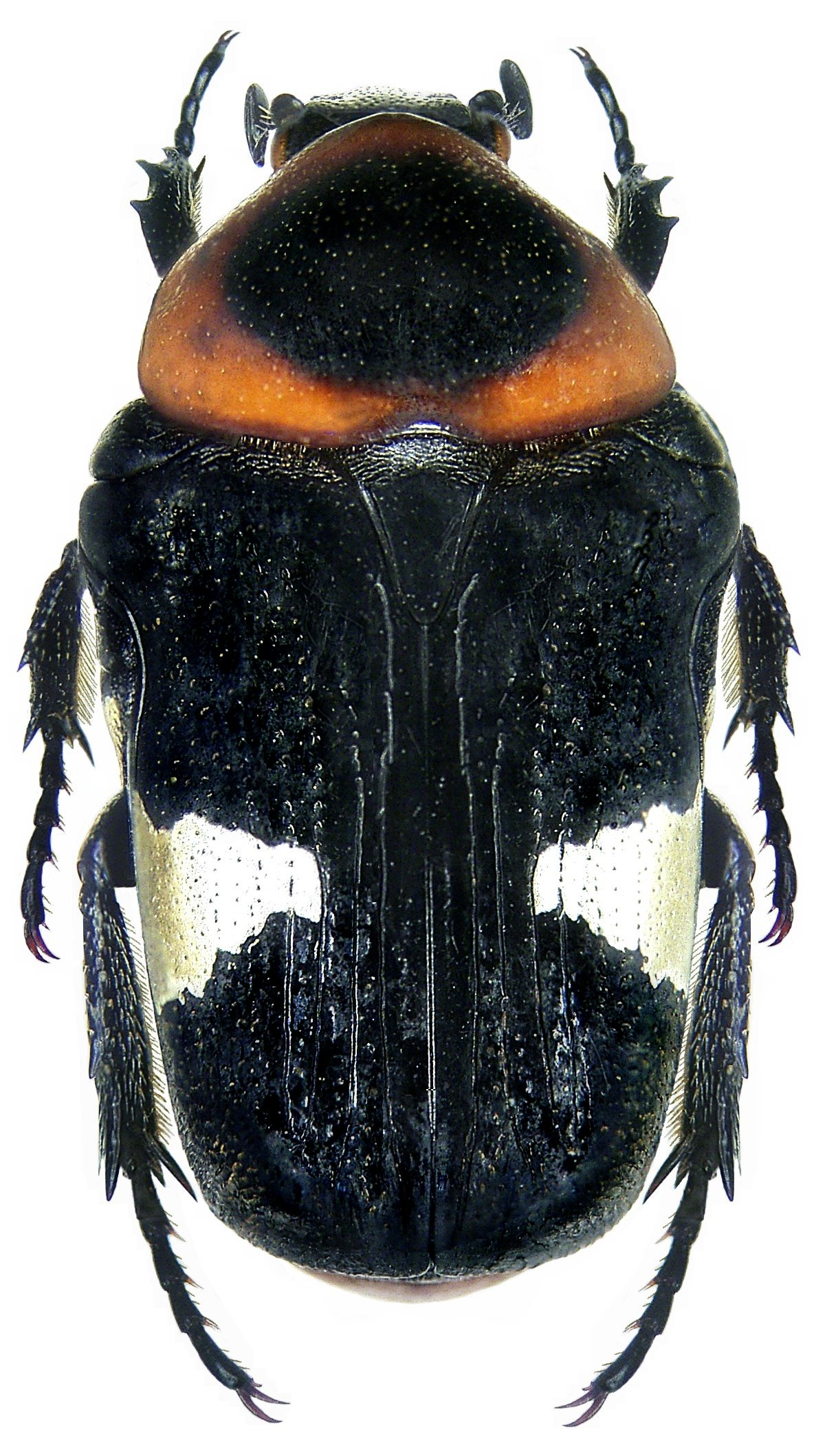

Scientific classification
- Kingdom: Animalia
- Phylum: Arthropoda
- Class: Insecta
- Order: Coleoptera
- Suborder: Polyphaga
- Infraorder: Scarabaeiformia
- Family: Scarabaeidae
- Subfamily: Cetoniinae
- Tribe: Cetoniini
- Subtribe: Cetoniina
- Genus: Glycyphana
- Species: G. horsfieldi

Binomial name
- Glycyphana horsfieldi (Hope, 1831)

Synonyms
- Cetonia horsfieldi Hope, 1831; Cetonia marginicollis Gory & Percheron, 1833; Glyciphana biargentata Thomson, 1878; Glycyphana horsfieldi chinensis Miksic, 1967

= Glycyphana horsfieldi =

Species of beetle

Glycyphana horsfieldi, is a species of flower chafer found in India, Sri Lanka, Malaysia, Thailand, Nepal, and Vietnam.

== Description ==
The average length of the adult beetle is about 2.7 cm. It has been observed from guava plantations. Grubs generally feed on rotten wood of Bombax insigne, Chloroxylon swietenia and Samanea saman.

There is a slight variation in beetles found from Indian subregion with Sri Lanka. The form in Himalayan region is small and narrow with small golden triangular elytral patches. Whereas the Sri Lankan form is usually larger and broader with the large golden elytral patches. Third instar has a cylindrical, dull whitish body. Average length of the third instar is about length 13 mm, with a 3mm width head capsule. Spiracles distinct, with a C-shaped yellowish brown cranium. Antenna has four antennomeres.

== Subspecies ==
Three subspecies are recognized.

- Glycyphana horsfieldi aurulenta Arrow, 1910
- Glycyphana horsfieldi horsfieldi Hope, 1831
- Glycyphana horsfieldi sylhetica Miksic, 1970

== Gallery ==
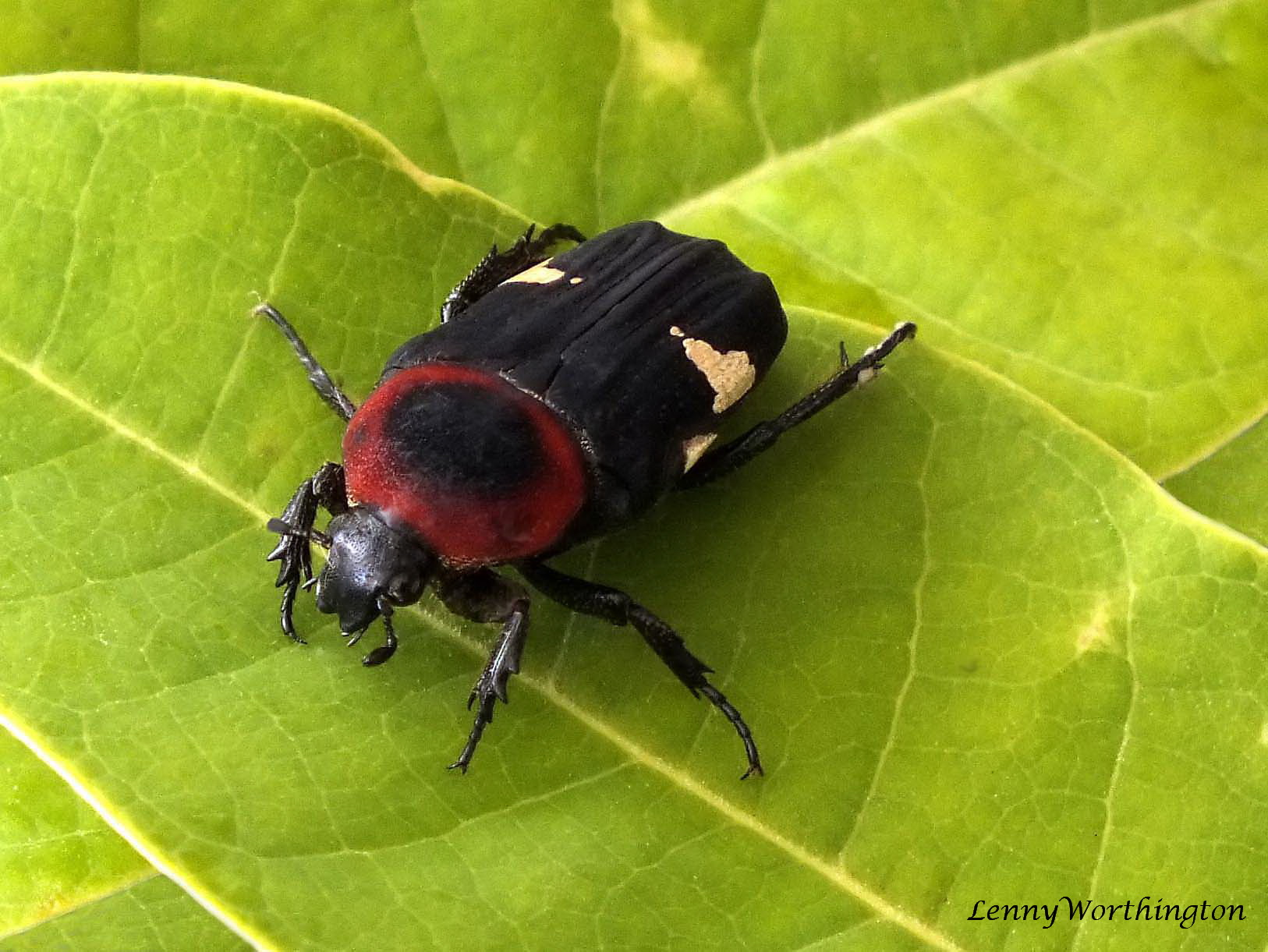

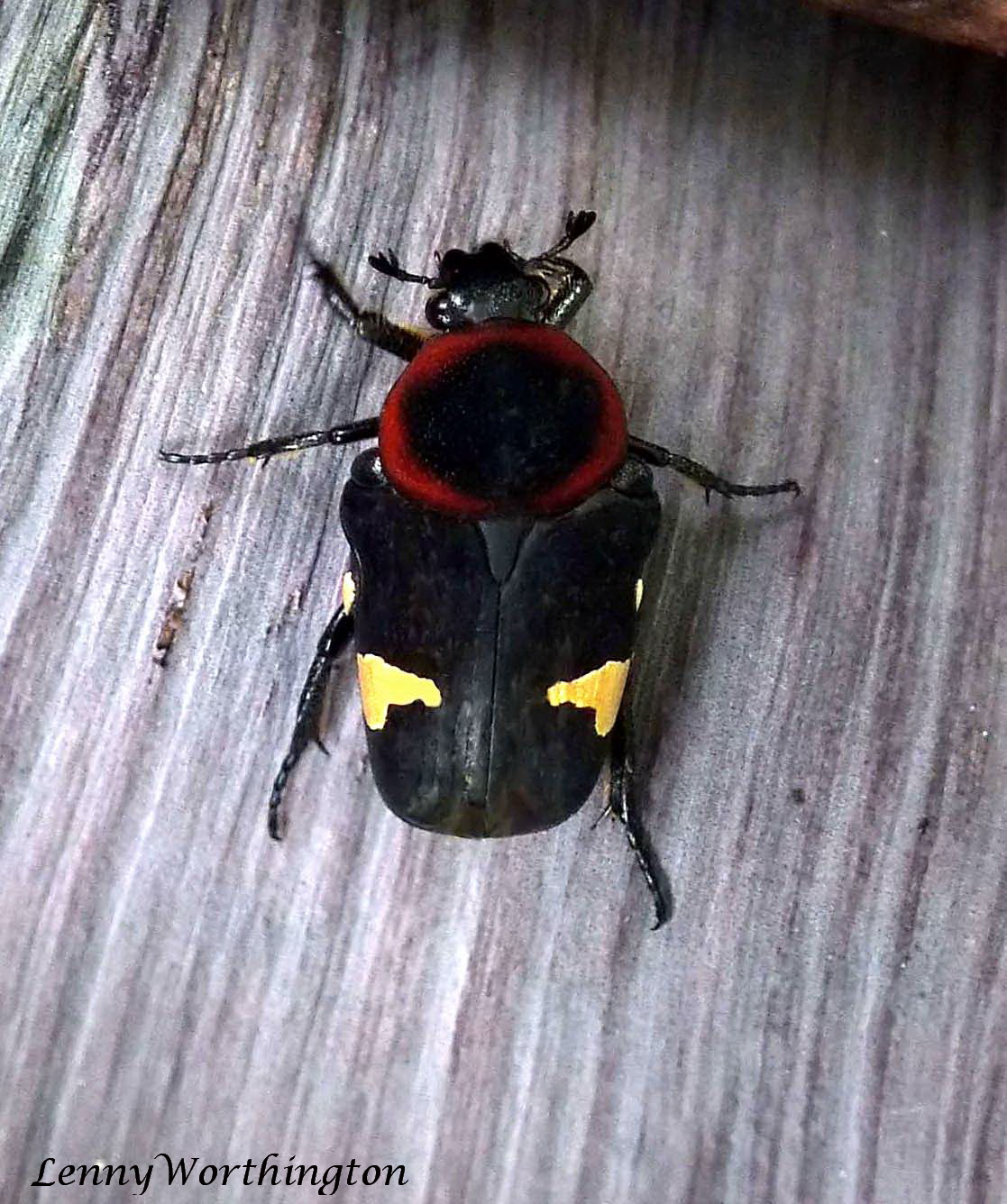

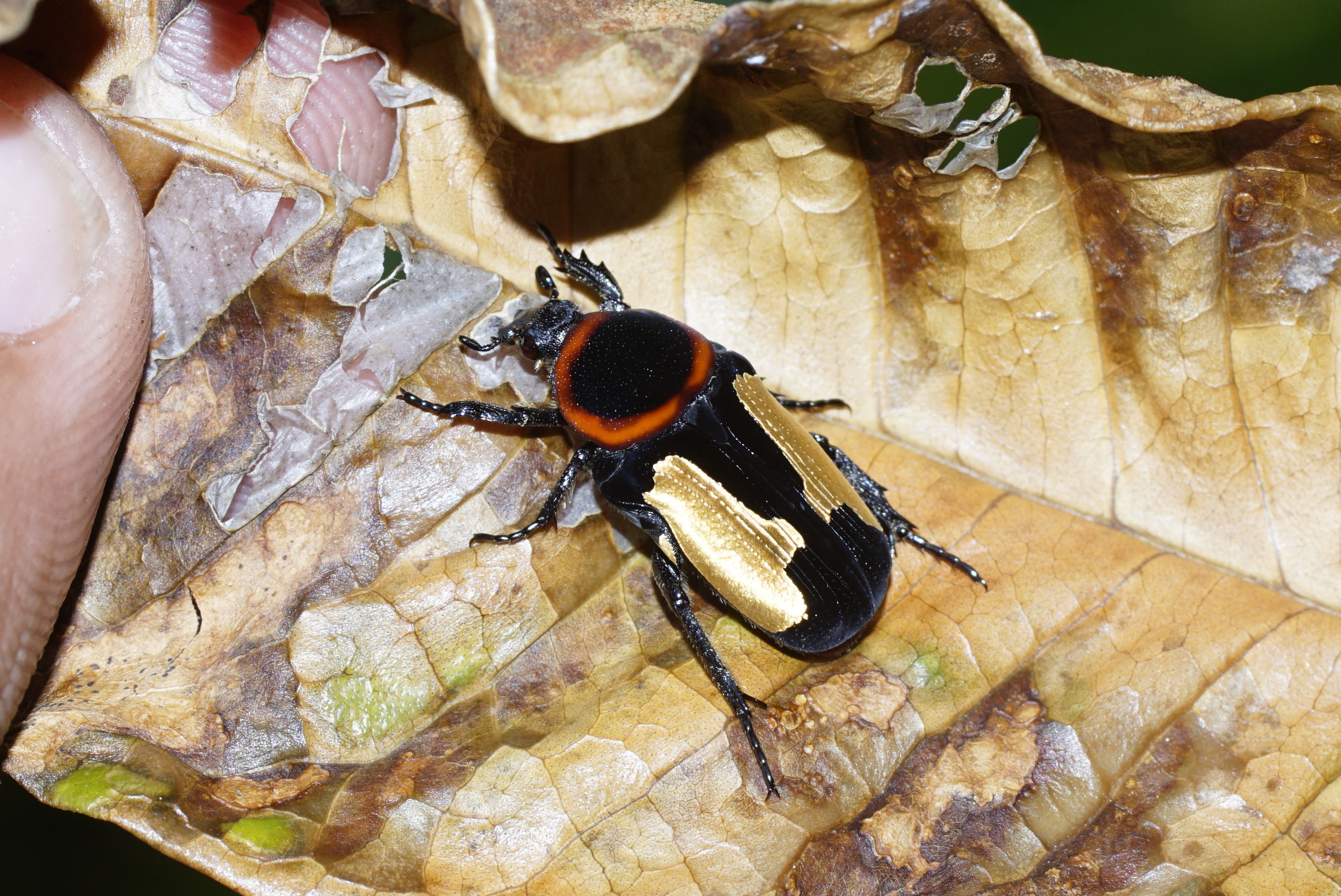

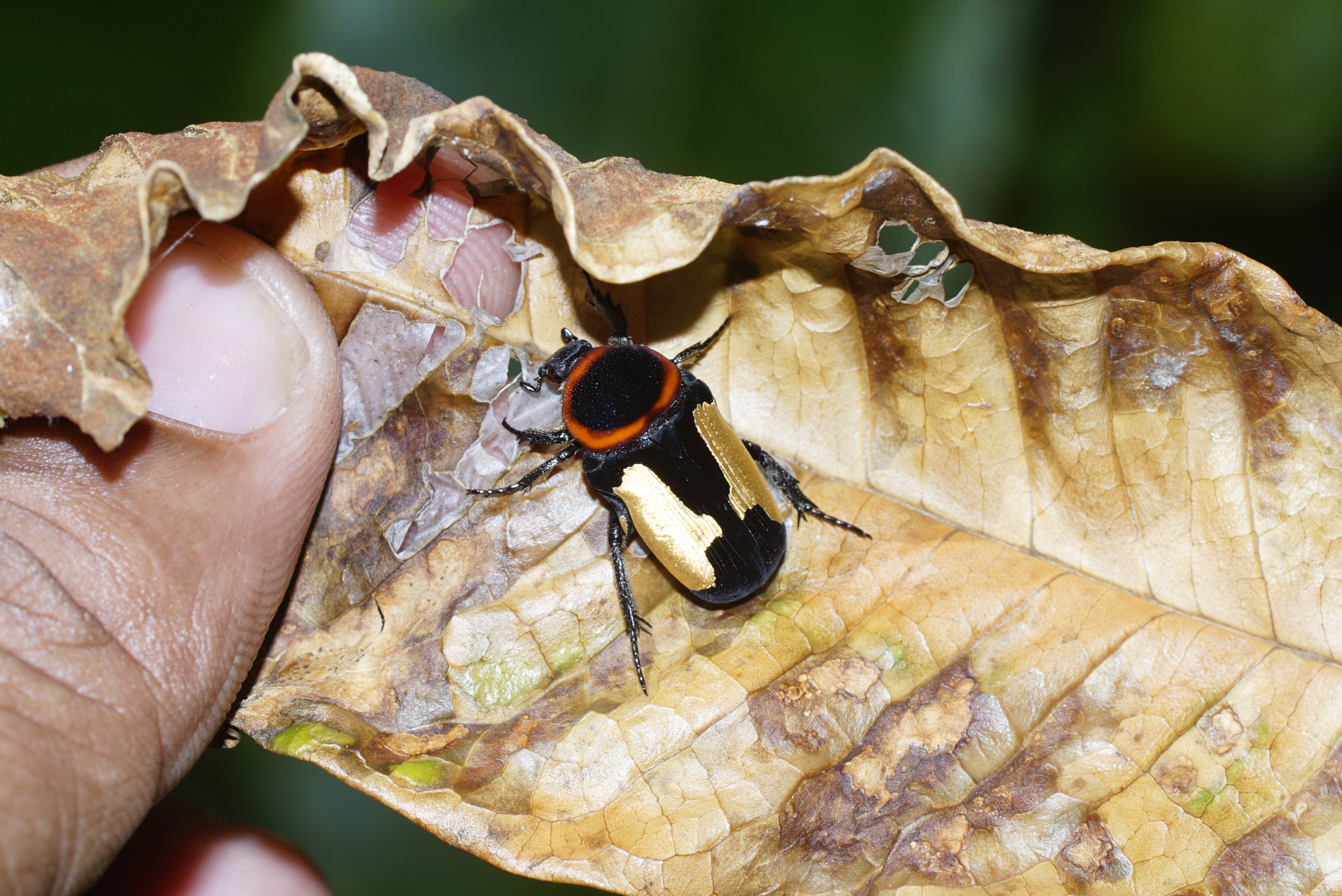
