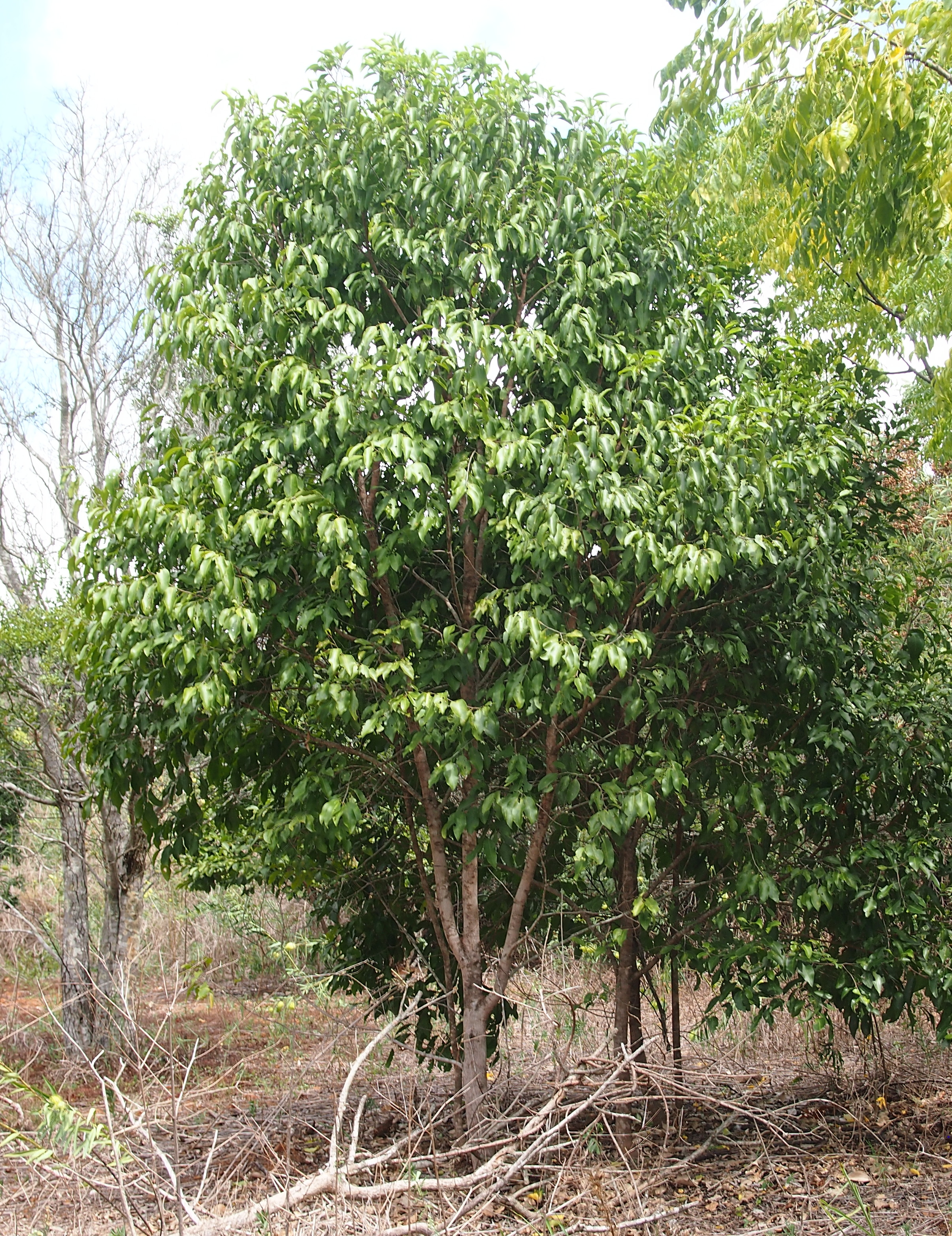

Scientific classification
- Kingdom: Plantae
- Clade: Tracheophytes
- Clade: Angiosperms
- Clade: Eudicots
- Clade: Rosids
- Order: Sapindales
- Family: Rutaceae
- Genus: Geijera
- Species: G. salicifolia

Binomial name
- Geijera salicifolia Schott

Synonyms
- Geijera latifolia Lindl.; Geijera salicifolia var. angustifolia Maiden & Betche; Geijera salicifolia var. augustifolia Maiden orth. var.; Geijera salicifolia var. latifolia (Lindl.) Domin; Geijera salicifolia Schott var. salicifolia; Geijera salicifolia var. typica Domin

= Geijera salicifolia =

Glasswood

Species of flowering plant

Geijera salicifolia, commonly known as glasswood, green satinheart or scrub wilga, is a species of shrub or tree in the family Rutaceae and is native to Australia, New Guinea and New Caledonia. It has narrow elliptic to egg-shaped leaves, small white flowers in loose groups and oval to more or less spherical fruit, each containing a shiny black seed.

== Description ==
Geijera salicifolia is a shrub or tree that typically grows to a height of 25–35 m (82–115 ft), sometimes with hairs on the branches, flowers and lower surface of the leaves. The leaves are narrow elliptic to egg-shaped, 60–130 mm (2.4–5.1 in) long and 10–50 mm (0.39–1.97 in) wide on a channelled petiole 3–22 mm (0.12–0.87 in) long. The flowers are arranged in loose groups 20–180 mm (0.79–7.09 in) long, the sepals 0.5–1.2 mm (0.020–0.047 in) long and the petals 2–3 mm (0.079–0.118 in) long. Flowering occurs from September to November and the fruit is oval to more or less spherical, 5–6 mm (0.20–0.24 in) long containing a shiny black seed.

== Taxonomy ==
Geijera salicifolia was first formally described in 1834 by Heinrich Wilhelm Schott in his book Rutaceae - Fragmenta Botanica.

== Distribution and habitat ==
Glasswood grows in rainforest, including dry rainforest, and woodland from sea level to an altitude of 880 m (2,890 ft) and occurs in New Guinea, New Caledonia and Australia. In Australia it is found from Coen in Queensland south to the Budderoo National Park in New South Wales and west to the north-east of the Northern Territory.

== Conservation status ==
This wilga is classified as of "least concern" under the Queensland Government Nature Conservation Act 1992 and the Territory Parks and Wildlife Conservation Act 1976.

== Gallery ==
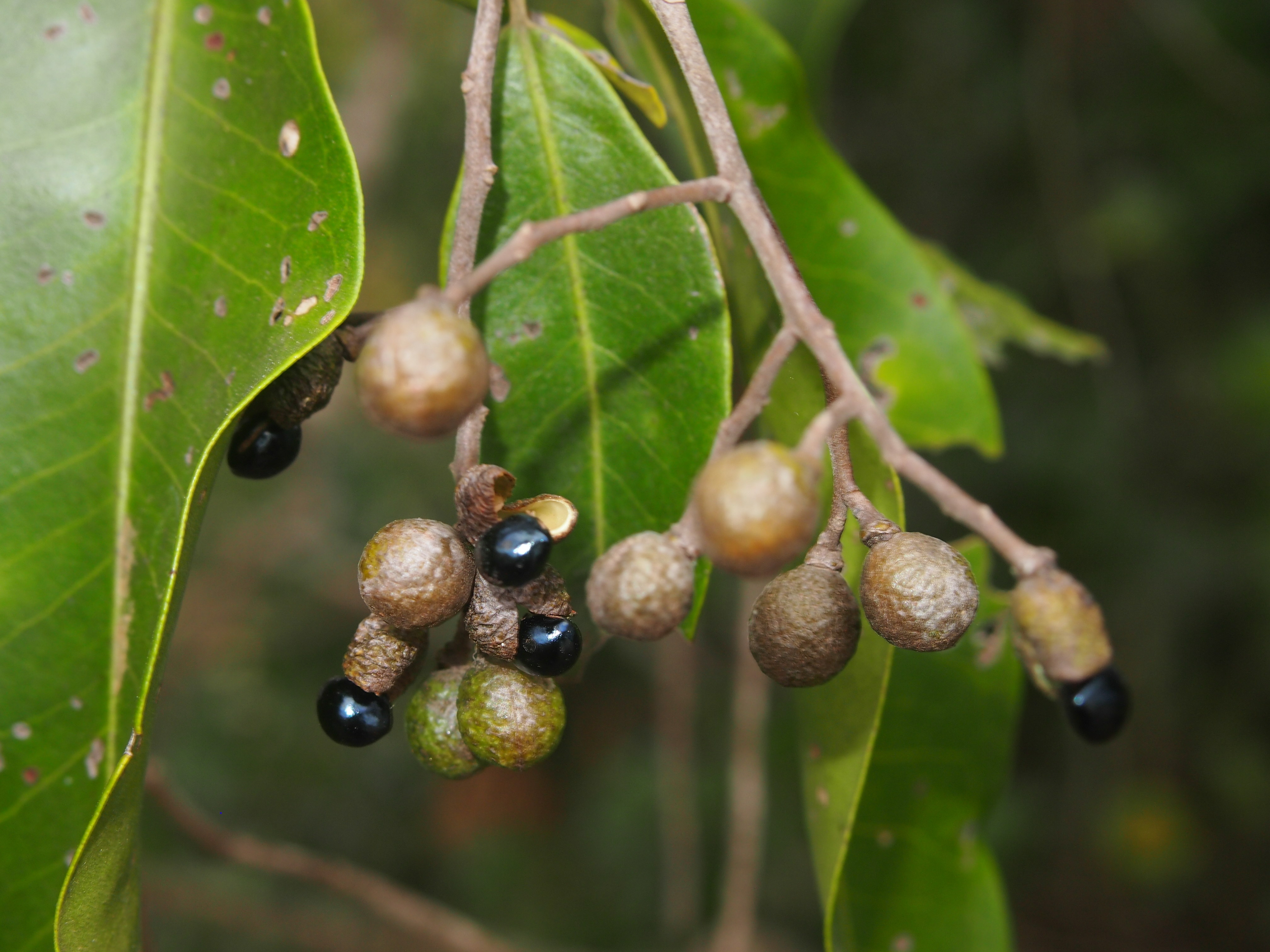
Fruit

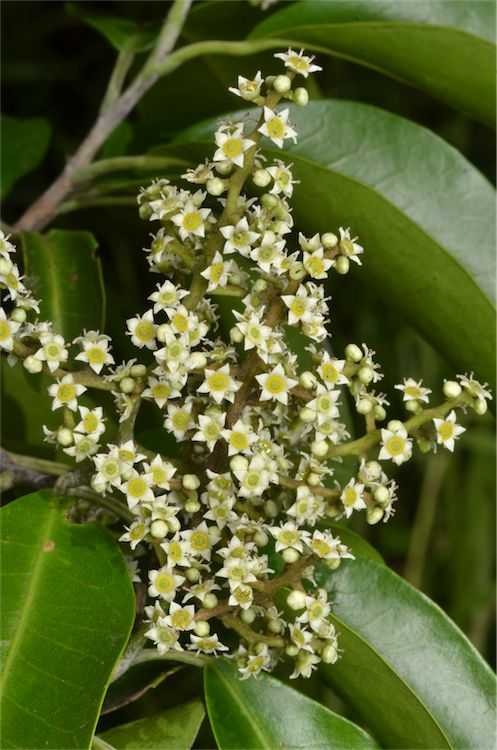
Flower detail

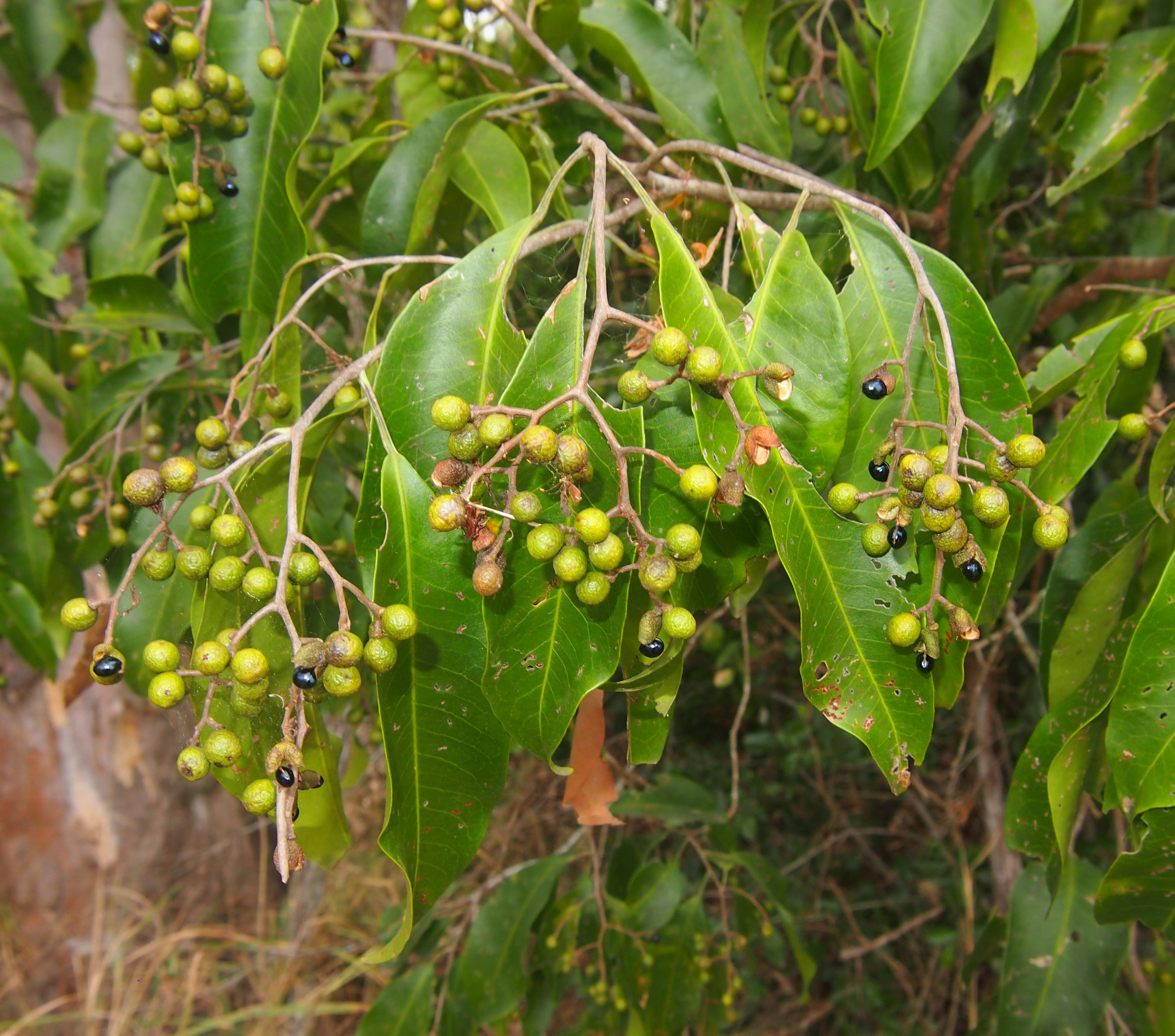
Foliage and fruit

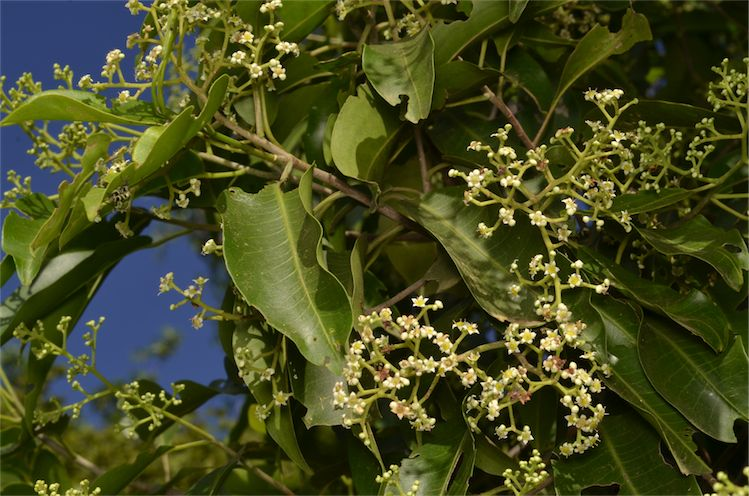
Flowers
