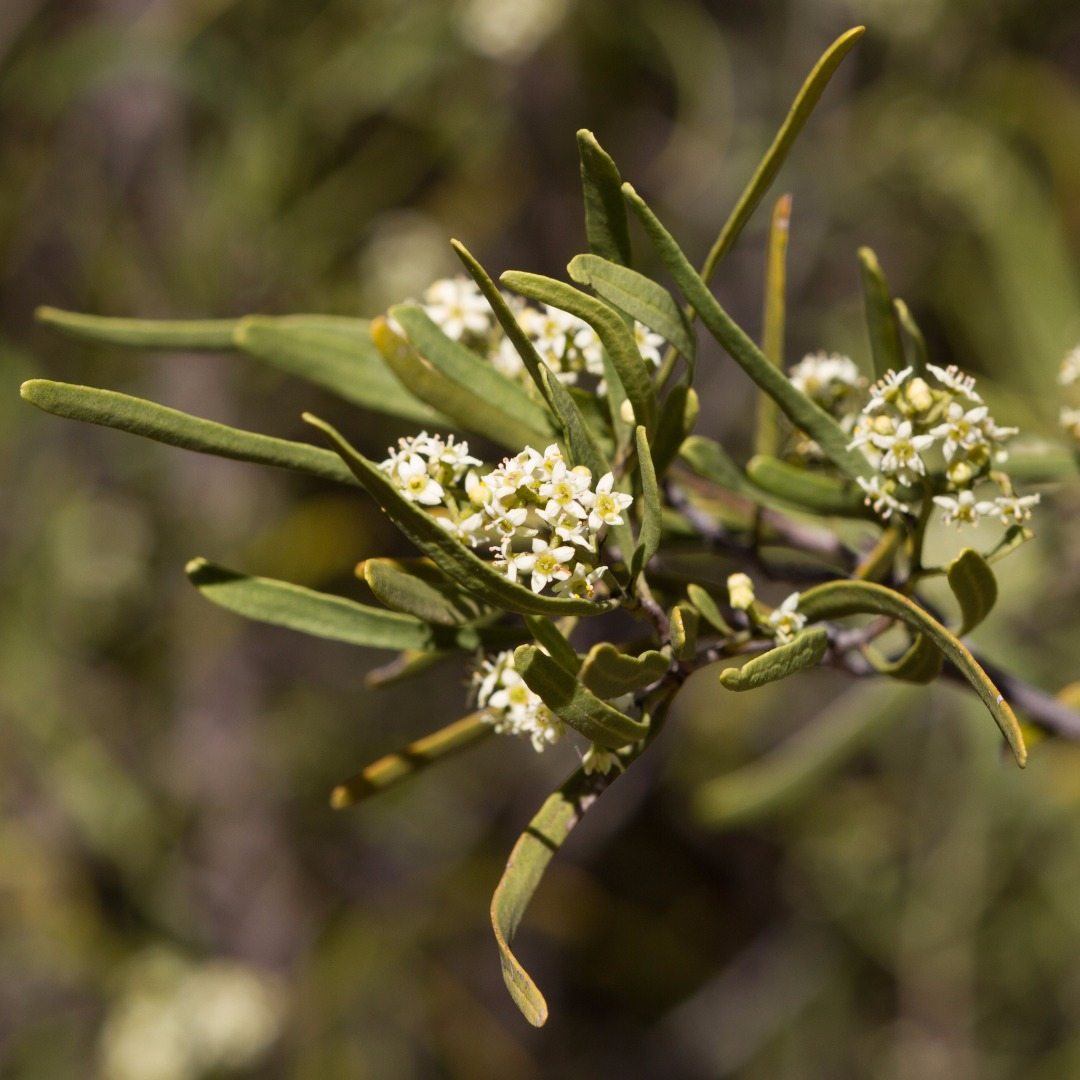

Scientific classification
- Kingdom: Plantae
- Clade: Tracheophytes
- Clade: Angiosperms
- Clade: Eudicots
- Clade: Rosids
- Order: Sapindales
- Family: Rutaceae
- Genus: Geijera
- Species: G. linearifolia

Binomial name
- Geijera linearifolia (DC.) J.M.Black

Synonyms
- Eriostemon linearifolium DC. orth. var.; Eriostemon linearifolius DC.; Geijera parviflora var. crassifolia Benth.; Zanthoxylum australasicum A.Juss.

= Geijera linearifolia =

Oilbush

Species of flowering plant

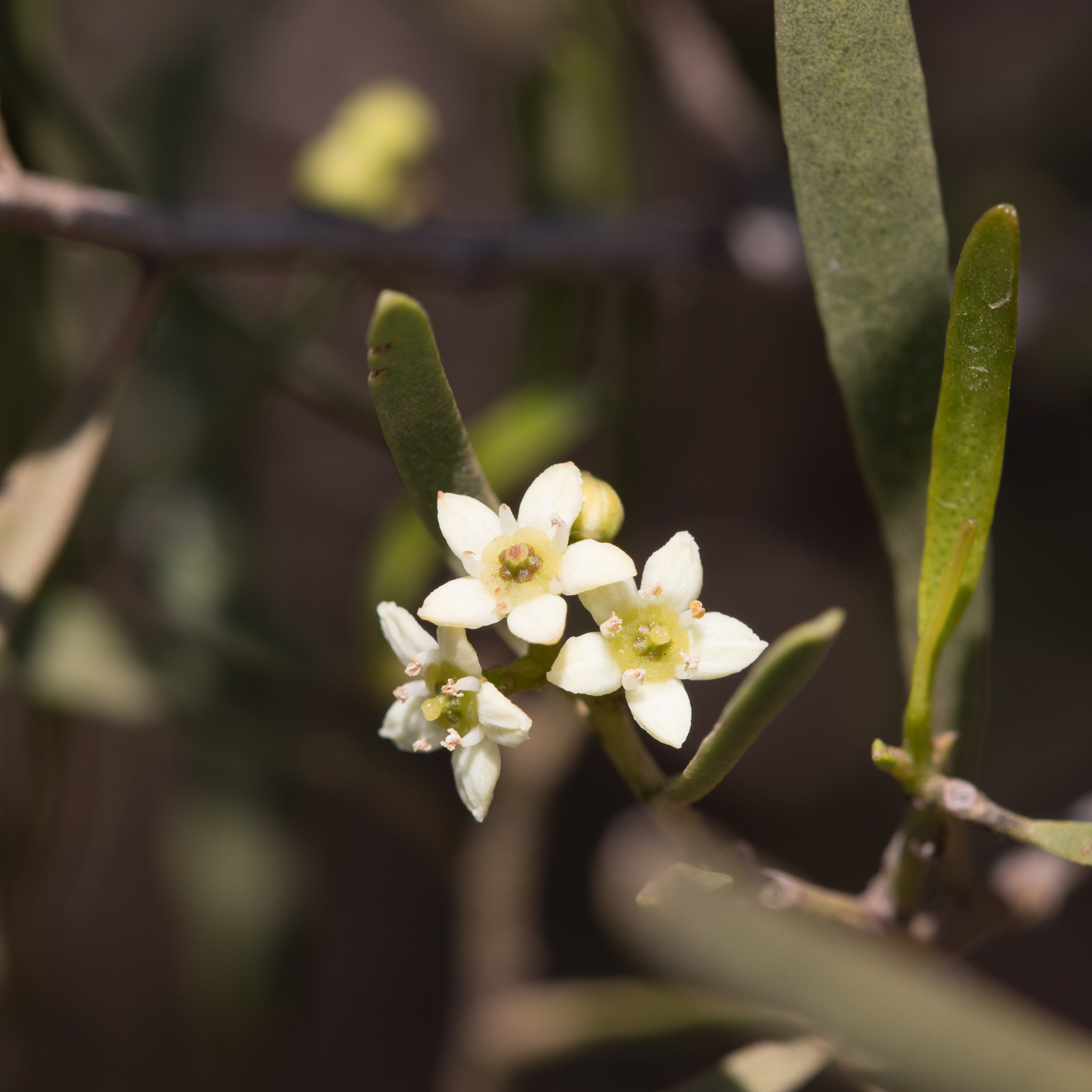
Flower detail

Geijera linearifolia, commonly known as oilbush or sheepbush, is a species of shrub in the family Rutaceae and is endemic to southern Australia. It has simple linear to oblong leaves, much-branched cymes of greenish-white flowers, and fruit containing a shiny black seed.

== Description ==
Geijera linearifolia is an erect, much-branched shrub that typically grows to a height of 1–3 m (3 ft 3 in – 9 ft 10 in). It has simple, linear to oblong or egg-shaped leaves with the narrower end towards the base, 15–65 mm (0.59–2.56 in) long and 2–5 mm (0.079–0.197 in) wide on a channelled petiole 2–5 mm (0.079–0.197 in) long. The flowers are glabrous and arranged in much-branched cymes 10–30 mm (0.39–1.18 in) long, each flower on a pedicel 1–3 mm (0.039–0.118 in) long, the petals egg-shaped, white to greenish white, 1.5–2 mm (0.059–0.079 in) long. Flowering occurs from August to October and the fruit is 4–6 mm (0.16–0.24 in) long and 3–4 mm (0.12–0.16 in) wide containing a single, shiny black seed.

== Taxonomy ==
Oilbush was first formally described in 1824 by de Candolle who gave it the name Eriostemon linearifolius and published the description in his treatise Prodromus Systematis Naturalis Regni Vegetabilis. In 1924, John McConnell Black changed the name to Geijera linearifolia.

== Distribution and habitat ==
Geijera linearifolia grows on rocky limestone on flats and around the edge of salt lakes in woodland and dry scrub. It occurs between Lake Kirk (between Norseman and Dundas) in central-southern Western Australia and the Murray River in South Australia.

== Conservation status ==
Geijera linearifolia is classified as "not threatened" by the Government of Western Australia Department of Parks and Wildlife.
