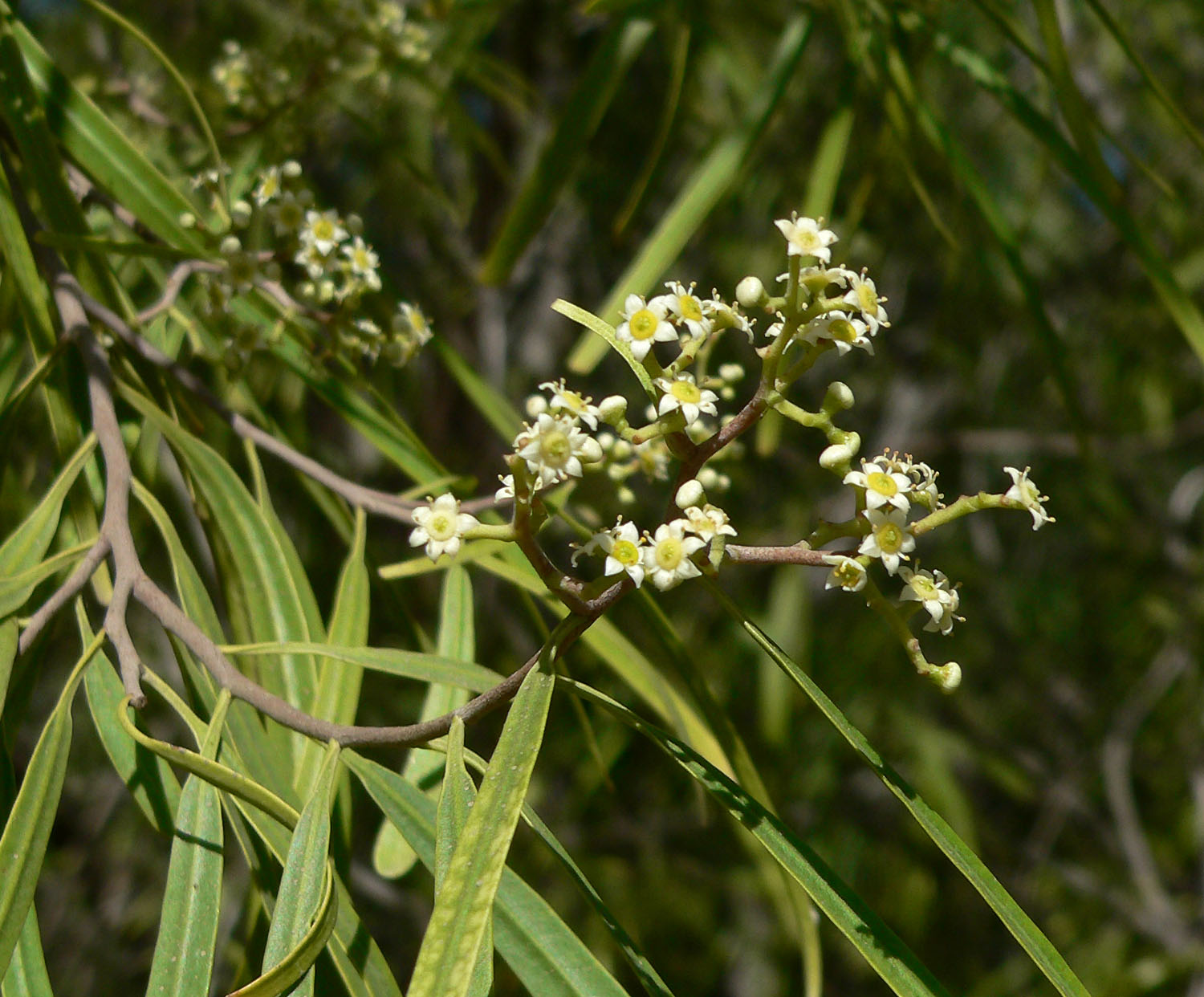
- Geijera parviflora

Scientific classification
- Kingdom: Plantae
- Clade: Embryophytes
- Clade: Tracheophytes
- Clade: Spermatophytes
- Clade: Angiosperms
- Clade: Eudicots
- Clade: Rosids
- Order: Sapindales
- Family: Rutaceae
- Subfamily: Zanthoxyloideae
- Genus: Geijera; Schott

Synonyms
- Coatesia F.Muell.; Dendrosma Pancher & Sebert

= Geijera =

Genus of flowering plants

Geijera is a genus of shrubs and trees in the family Rutaceae and are native to New Guinea, Australia and New Caledonia. They have simple leaves arranged alternately, panicles of bisexual flowers usually with five, sometimes four, sepals, petals and stamens and fruit containing shiny black seeds.

== Description ==
Plants in the genus Geijera are shrubs or trees with simple leaves arranged alternately. They have small, bisexual flowers arranged in many-flowered panicles in upper leaf axils and on the ends of branchlets and usually have five, sometimes four sepals, petals and stamens. The sepals are fused at the base, up to 1 mm (0.039 in) long, and persist in the fruit. The petals are white or cream-coloured, up to 2 mm (0.079 in) long and the stamens are up to 1.5 mm (0.059 in) long and arranged opposite the sepals. The fruit consists of up to five more or less spherical follicles joined at the base each with a single shiny black seed.

== Taxonomy ==
The genus Geijera was first formally described in 1834 by Schott in his book Rutaceae - Fragmenta Botanica and the first species to be describe (the type species) was Geijera salicifolia. The name Geijera honours J.D. Geijer, a 17th century Swedish botanist.

=== Species list ===
The following is a list of species accepted by the Australian Plant Census, or Plants of the World Online for species outside Australia:

- Geijera balansae Schinz & Guillaumin – New Caledonia
- Geijera cauliflora Baill. – New Caledonia
- Geijera deplanchei (Pancher & Siebert) Däniker – New Caledonia
- Geijera linearifolia (DC.) J.M.Black – South Australia, Western Australia
- Geijera parviflora Lindl. – Queensland, New South Wales, Victoria, South Australia
- Geijera salicifolia Schott – New Guinea, New Caledonia, Queensland, New South Wales, Northern Territory.

Plants of the World Online includes G. helmsiae and G. paniculata but the Australian Plants Census lists these as synonyms of Coatesia paniculata.

== Distribution and habitat ==
Most species of Geijera grow in tropical or subtropical rainforest. Three species occur on New Caledonia, and three in Australia, two of which are endemic.
