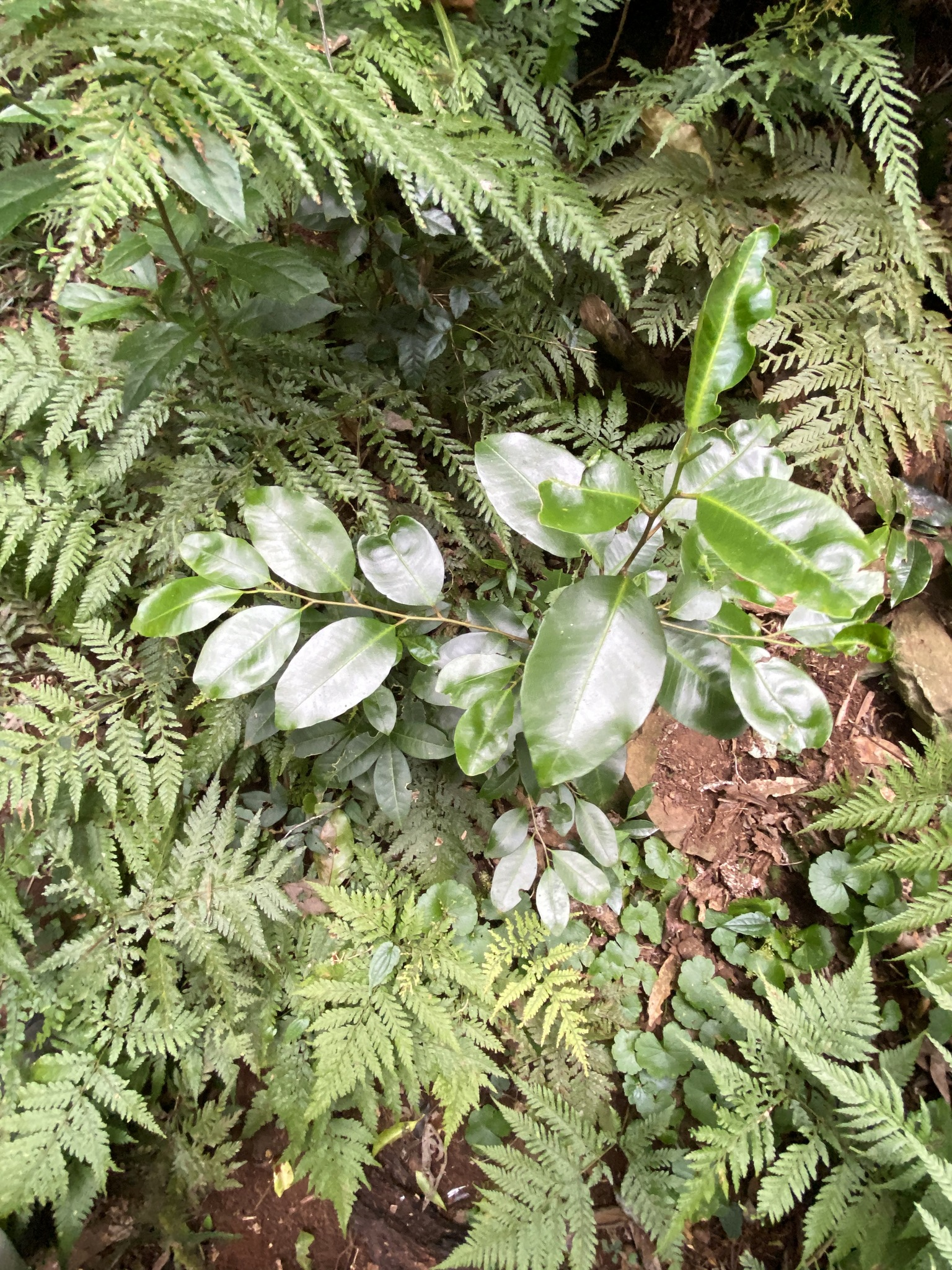
- Young specimen in the Main Range, Queensland, Australia.

Scientific classification
- Kingdom: Plantae
- Clade: Tracheophytes
- Clade: Angiosperms
- Clade: Eudicots
- Clade: Rosids
- Order: Sapindales
- Family: Rutaceae
- Subfamily: Zanthoxyloideae
- Genus: Coatesia; F.Muell.
- Species: C. paniculata

Binomial name
- Coatesia paniculata F.Muell.

Synonyms
- Geijera helmsiae F.M.Bailey; Geijera muelleri Benth. nom. illeg.; Geijera paniculata (F.Muell.) Druce

= Coatesia =

Genus of flowering plants

Coatesia is a genus of plant containing the single species Coatesia paniculata, commonly known as axe-breaker or capivi, and is endemic to eastern Australia. It is a small, evergreen tree with simple, elliptical to egg-shaped leaves, panicles of white flowers on the ends of branchlets or in leaf axils and fused follicles with one black seed in each follicle.

== Description ==
Coatesia paniculata is a tree that typically grows to a height of 3–12 m (9.8–39.4 ft). It has simple leaves that are elliptical to egg-shaped, 40–100 mm (1.6–3.9 in) long and 15–45 mm (0.59–1.77 in) wide on a petiole 9–14 mm (0.35–0.55 in) long and grooved on the upper side. The leaves are glabrous, the upper surface glossy dark green and the lower surface paler, and are strongly fragrant when crushed. The flowers are arranged on the ends of branchlets or in upper leaf axils, in panicles 15–90 mm (0.59–3.54 in) long. The five sepals are about 1 mm (0.039 in) long and fused at the base, the five white petals 2.5–3 mm (0.098–0.118 in) long, and there are five stamens that are opposite to and shorter than the petals. Flowering occurs from April to May and the fruit is oval, beaked and 8–9 mm (0.31–0.35 in) long with one glossy black seed in each of the two or three follicles.

== Taxonomy ==
The genus Coatesia and the species Coatesia paniculata were first formally described in 1862 by Ferdinand von Mueller in his book Fragmenta phytographiae Australiae. As of September 2021, Plants of the World Online treated the genus as a synonym of Geijera, but it is accepted in a 2021 classification of the family Rutaceae, and placed in the subfamily Zanthoxyloideae.

== Distribution and habitat ==
Coatesia paniculata grows in rainforest, often dry rainforest, and occurs from Mount Abbot near Bowen in central-eastern Queensland and south to north-eastern New South Wales.

== Conservation status ==
This tree is listed as of "least concern" under the Queensland Government Nature Conservation Act 1992 but as "endangered" under the New South Wales Government Biodiversity Conservation Act 2016. The species is only known from a few locations near Tweed Heads, Lismore and Wardell in New South Wales and is threatened by land clearing, weed invasion and grazing by domestic livestock.
