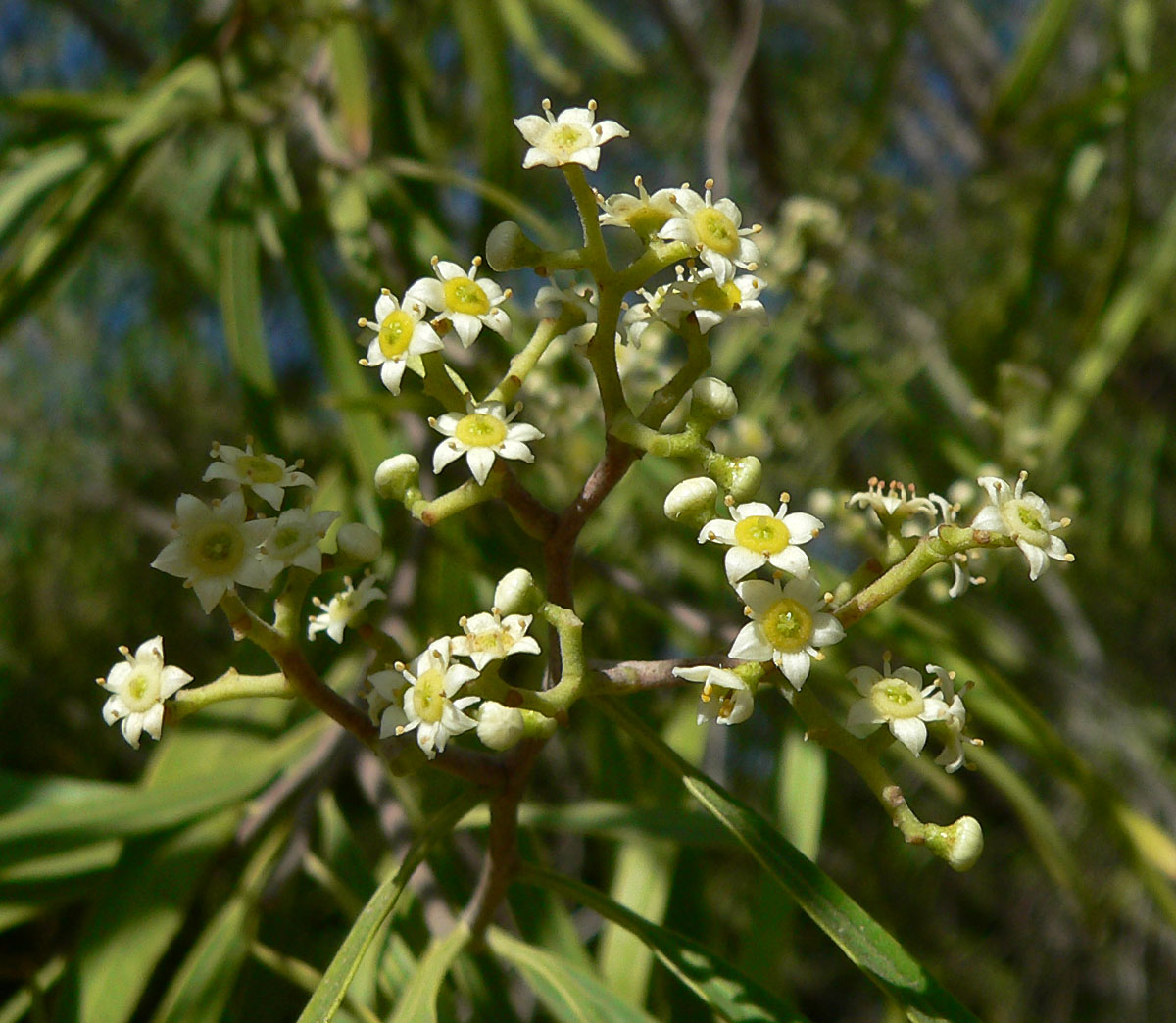
- Cultivated specimen, Springs Preserve

Scientific classification
- Kingdom: Plantae
- Clade: Tracheophytes
- Clade: Angiosperms
- Clade: Eudicots
- Clade: Rosids
- Order: Sapindales
- Family: Rutaceae
- Genus: Geijera
- Species: G. parviflora

Binomial name
- Geijera parviflora Lindl.

Synonyms
- Geijera parviflora Lindl. var. parviflora; Geijera pendula Lindl.

= Geijera parviflora =

Wilga

Species of plant

Geijera parviflora, commonly known as wilga, is a species of shrub or small tree in the family Rutaceae and is endemic to inland parts of eastern Australia. It has drooping branches, linear to narrow lance-shaped leaves, small white flowers in loose panicles and spherical fruit containing a shiny black seed. Other vernacular names include Australian willow, native willow, sheepbush and dogwood.

== Description ==
Geijera parviflora is a shrub or tree that typically grows to a height of 8–10 m (26–33 ft) and has drooping branches and leaves often reaching ground level, but these are often grazed by sheep. The leaves are glossy dark green, linear to lance-shaped, 35–180 mm (1.4–7.1 in) long and 4–10 mm (0.16–0.39 in) wide on a petiole 3–12 mm (0.12–0.47 in) long. The leaves give off a strong smell when crushed. The flowers are arranged in loose panicles 40–70 mm (1.6–2.8 in) long, each flower on a pedicel about 1 mm (0.039 in) long. The sepals are 0.8–1 mm (0.031–0.039 in) long, the petals white and 1.5–2.5 mm (0.059–0.098 in) long. The smell of the flowers has been described as foetid, but also as citrus-scented and attracts insects. Flowering occurs from June to November and the fruit is more or less spherical, 4–5 mm (0.16–0.20 in) in diameter, each containing a single shiny black seed.

== Taxonomy ==
Geijera parviflora was first formally described in 1848 by English botanist John Lindley in Thomas Mitchell's Journal of an Expedition into the Interior of Tropical Australia. The specific epithet parviflora is from the Latin, meaning "small flowers".

== Distribution and habitat ==
Wilga prefers calcareous soils, either red clays or sandy soils, and grows as scattered trees in open woodland or occasionally in stands. It is mainly found in inland New South Wales and Queensland, extending into south-eastern South Australia and is rare in Victoria where it is only known from the north-west of the state, near Kenley.

== Uses ==
Wilga is a useful shade and fodder tree in agricultural areas. Sheep particularly enjoy grazing on the lower branches, although trees appear to vary greatly in palatability (some are eagerly sought after and others ignored). The reason for this variation is unknown, and soil composition is speculated as a cause. Despite being slow growing, it is planted in Australia and overseas as an ornamental. It prefers full sunshine, and can tolerate the occasional light frost and drought. Indigenous Australians chewed the aromatic leaves for alleviating toothache. Regeneration from fresh seed and cuttings has proven to be difficult. It is suggested that the hard seed coat should be cracked, to assist seed germination.

== Gallery ==
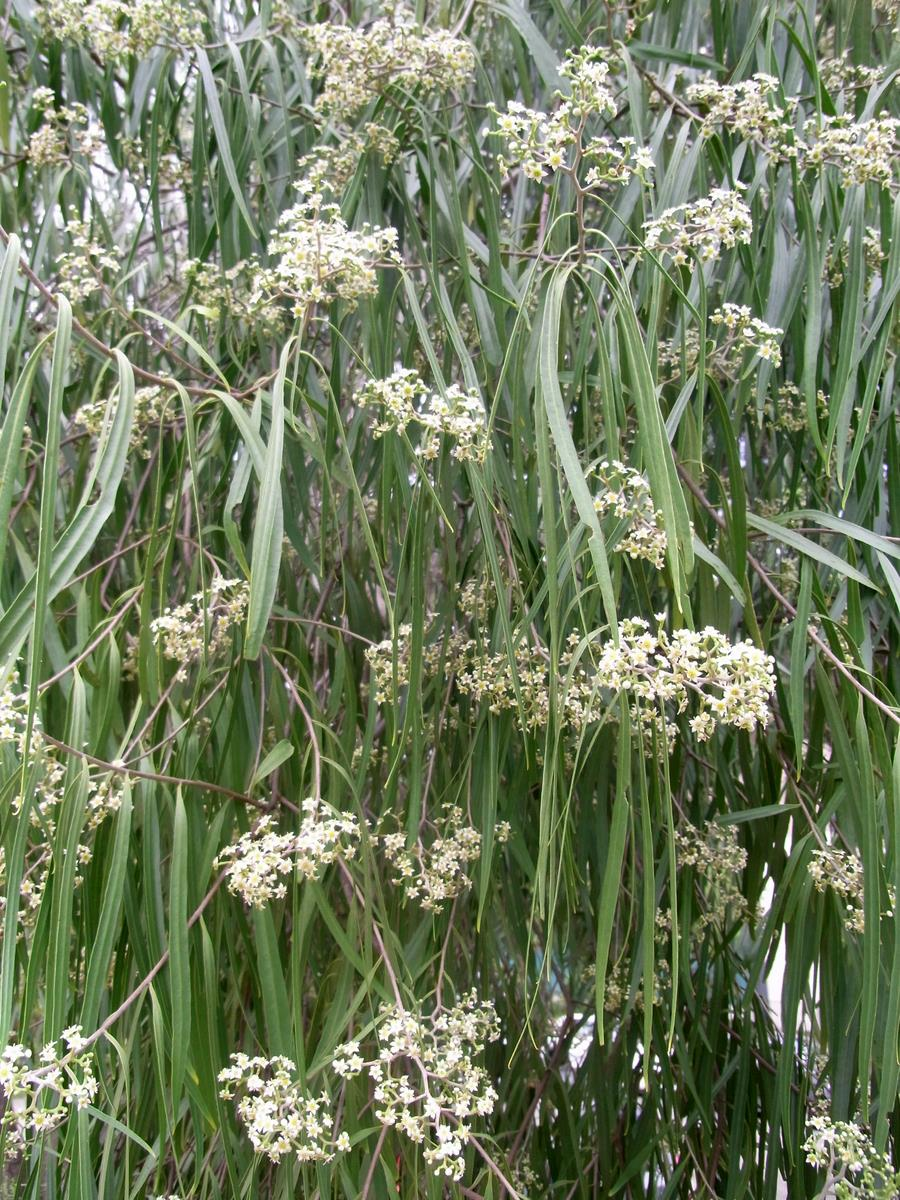
Willowy leaves

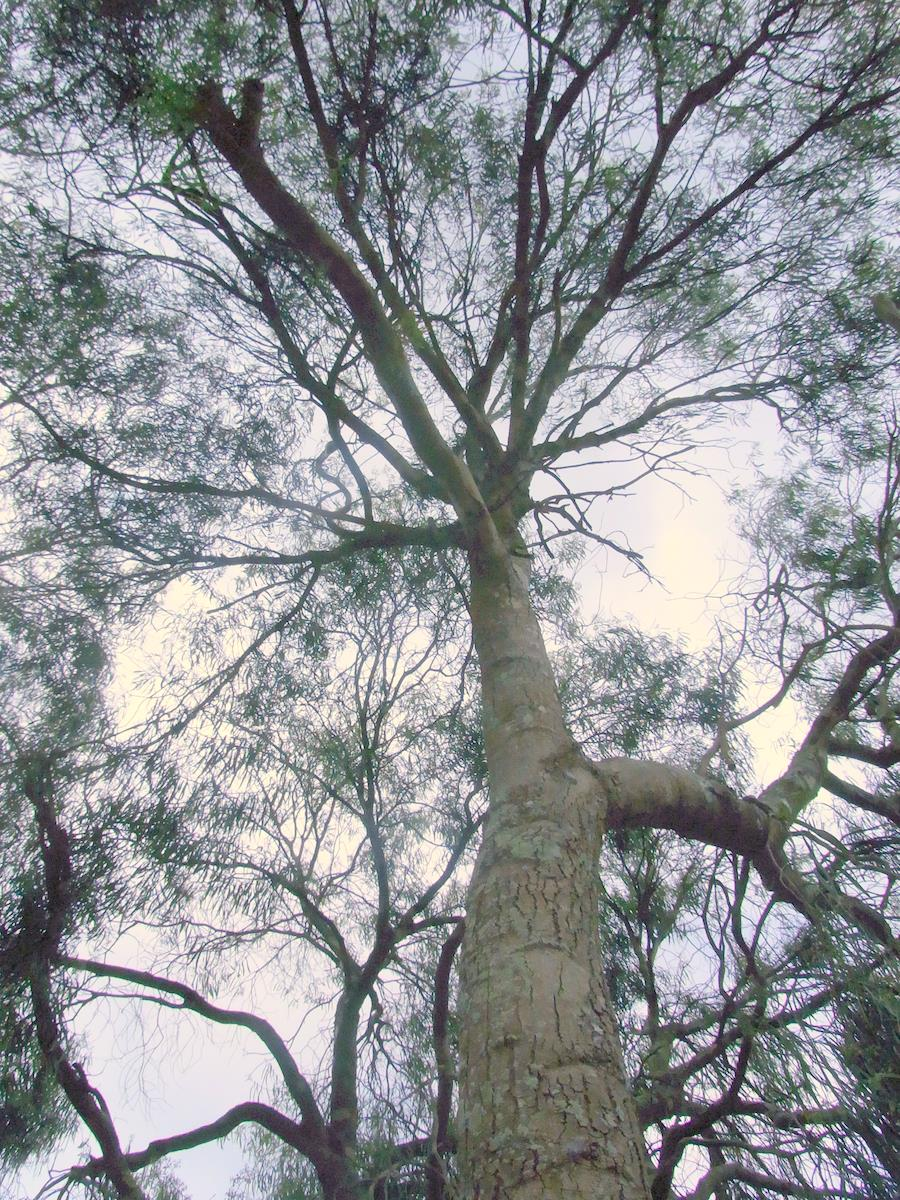
Habit

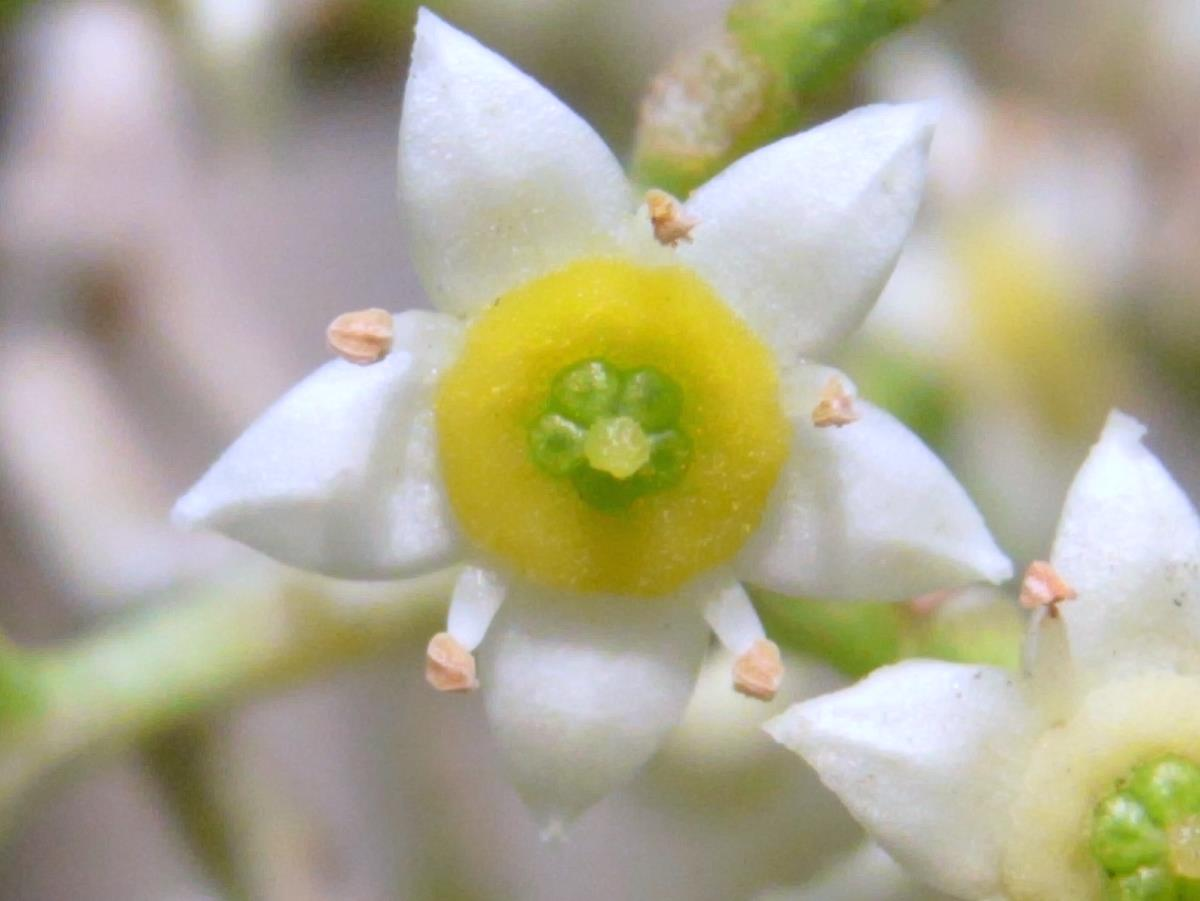
Flower close up

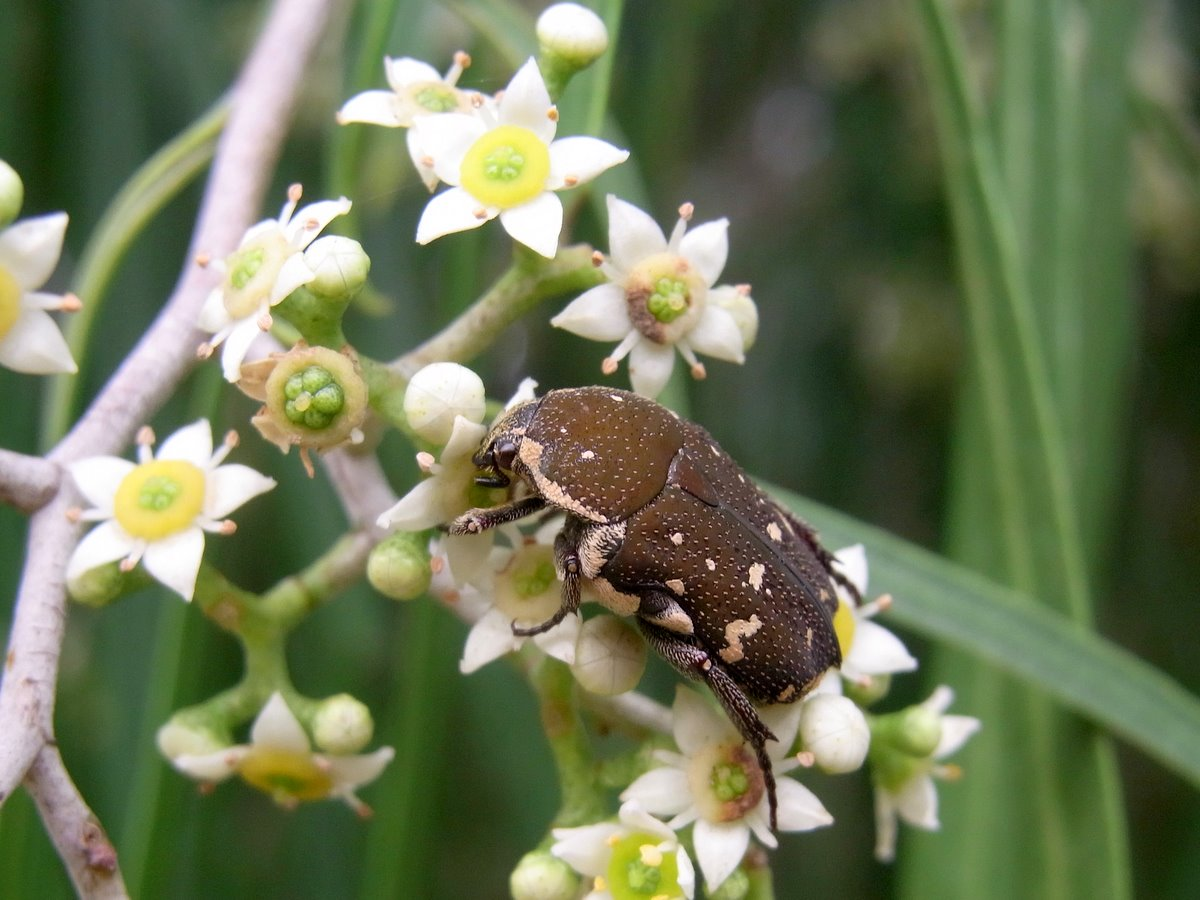
Flowers attract insects
