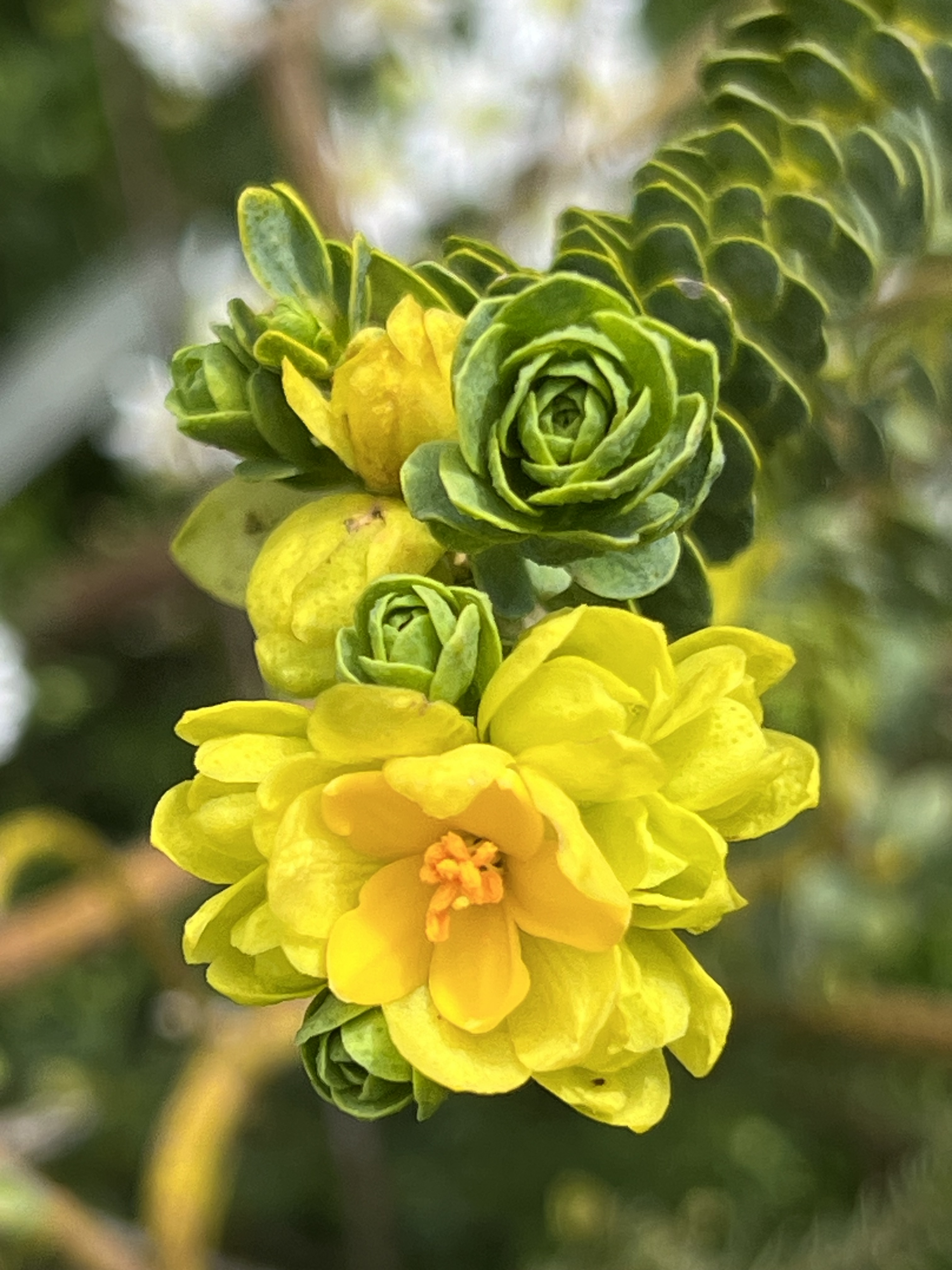

Scientific classification
- Kingdom: Plantae
- Clade: Tracheophytes
- Clade: Angiosperms
- Clade: Eudicots
- Clade: Rosids
- Order: Sapindales
- Family: Rutaceae
- Genus: Geleznowia
- Species: G. verrucosa

Binomial name
- Geleznowia verrucosa Turcz.

= Geleznowia verrucosa =

Genus of flowering plants

Geleznowia verrucosa is a species of flowering plant in the family Rutaceae. It is a small shrub with oval-shaped leaves, yellow flowers and is endemic to Western Australia.

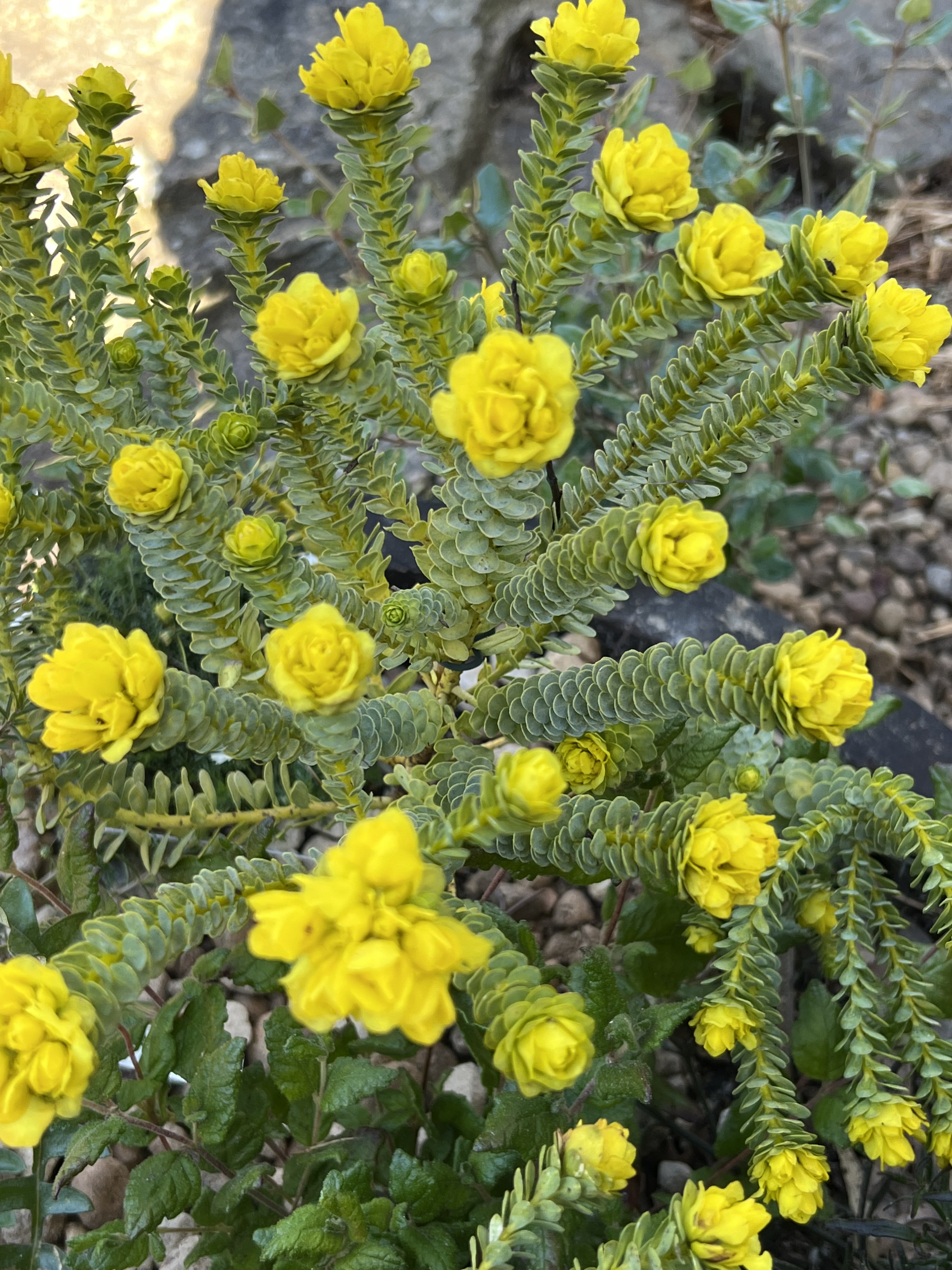
Habit

== Description ==
Geleznowia verrucosa is a shrub to 1 m (3 ft 3 in) high with warty branchlets that are covered with star-shaped hairs or scales. The thick, oval-shaped leaves are arranged alternately, 3–6 mm (0.12–0.24 in) long, 2–2.5 mm (0.079–0.098 in) wide, warty, margins flat, leaves covered in scales or star-shaped hairs. The yellow flowers are borne at the end of branchlets, outer yellow-green bracts are 5–8 mm (0.20–0.31 in) long, calyx 6–12 mm (0.24–0.47 in) long, warty, mostly smooth except for small, star-shaped hairs on the edges, petals 6–8 mm (0.24–0.31 in) long, overlapping and smooth. Flowering occurs in July to October.

== Taxonomy and naming ==
Geleznowia verrucosa was first formally described in 1849 by Ukrainian-Russian botanist Nicolai Stepanovitch Turczaninow and the description was published in Bulletin de la Société Impériale des Naturalistes de Moscou. The specific epithet (verrucosa) means "covered with warts".

== Distribution and habitat ==
This species grows on sand plains and gravelly soils in south-eastern Western Australia north of Perth.
