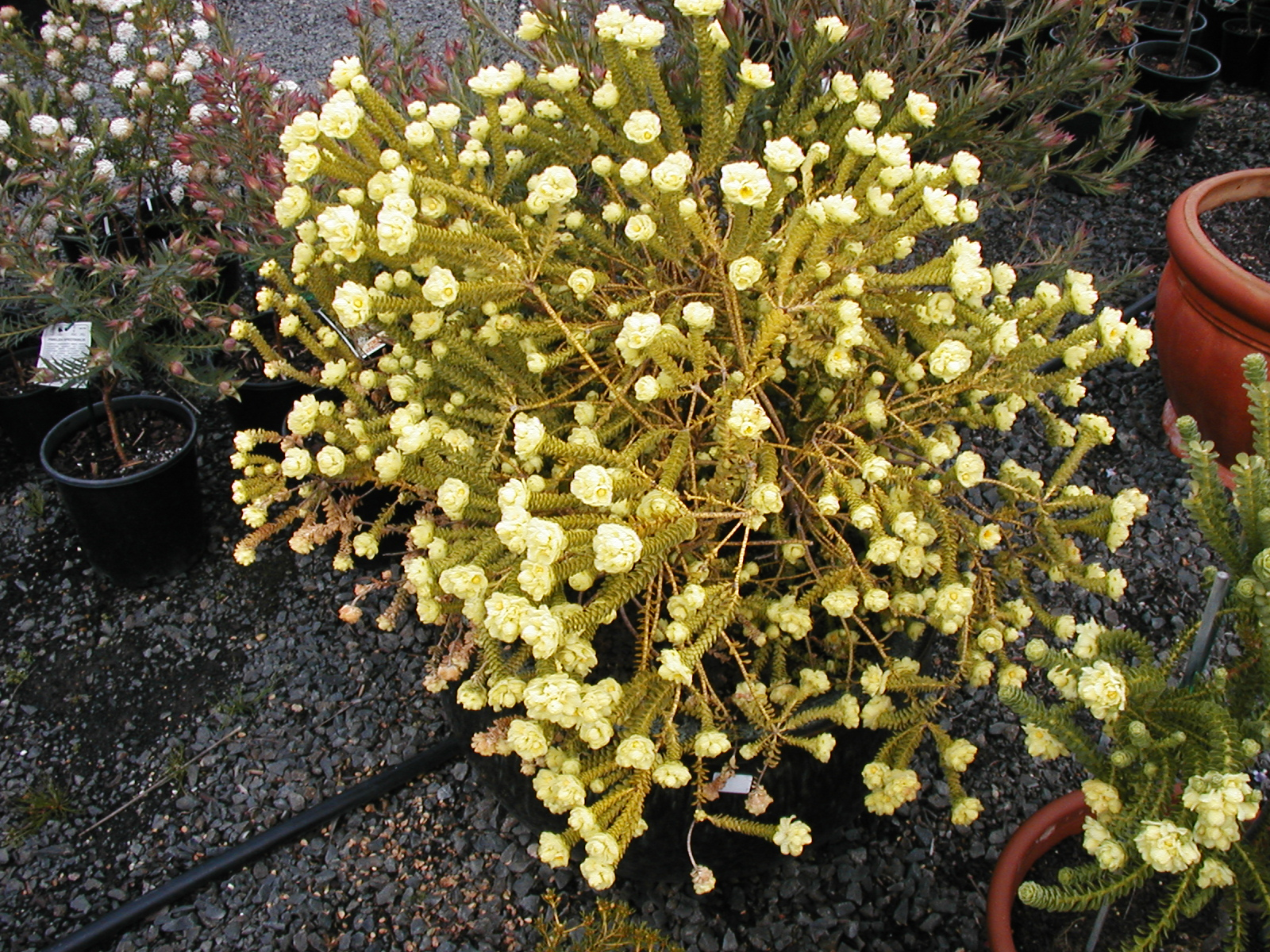
- Geleznowia verrucosa

Scientific classification
- Kingdom: Plantae
- Clade: Tracheophytes
- Clade: Angiosperms
- Clade: Eudicots
- Clade: Rosids
- Order: Sapindales
- Family: Rutaceae
- Subfamily: Zanthoxyloideae
- Genus: Geleznowia; Turcz.

= Geleznowia =

Genus of plants

Geleznowia is a small genus of flowering plants in the family Rutaceae.

Its native range is Western Australia, north of Perth.

The genus is named after Russian botanist Nikolai Zheleznov (1816-1877).

Species:

- Geleznowia amabilis K.A.Sheph & A.D.Crawford
- Geleznowia calycina (Harv.) Benth
- Geleznowia eximia K.A.Sheph & A.D.Crawford
- Geleznowia narcissoides K.A.Sheph & A.D.Crawford
- Geleznowia occulta K.A.Sheph & A.D.Crawford
- Geleznowia uberiflora K.A.Sheph & A.D.Crawford
- Geleznowia verrucosa Turcz
