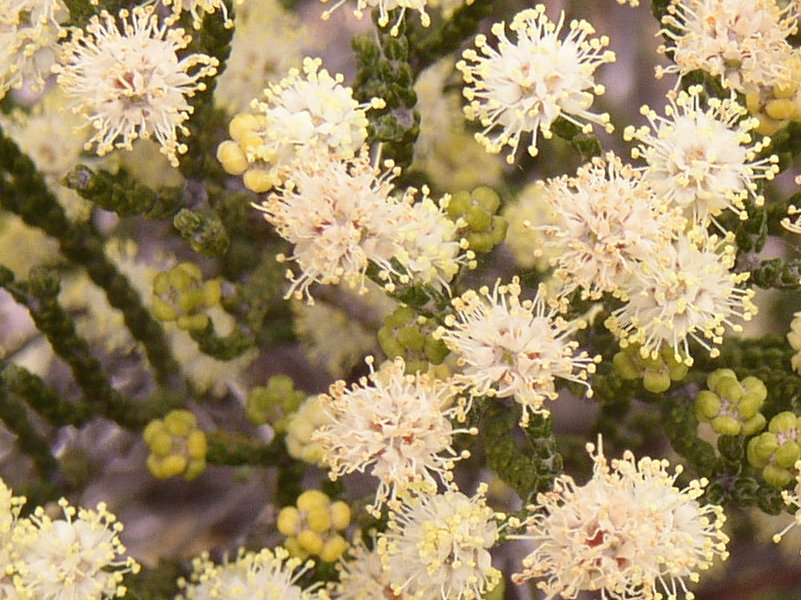
- Microcybe multiflora subsp. baccharoides

Scientific classification
- Kingdom: Plantae
- Clade: Tracheophytes
- Clade: Angiosperms
- Clade: Eudicots
- Clade: Rosids
- Order: Sapindales
- Family: Rutaceae
- Subfamily: Zanthoxyloideae
- Genus: Microcybe; Turcz.

Species
- See text.

= Microcybe =

Genus of flowering plants

Microcybe is a genus of plants in the family Rutaceae, all of which are native to Australia.

There are three species:

- Microcybe albiflora Turcz. (Western Australia)
- Microcybe multiflora Turcz. — red microcybe (Western Australia, South Australia, Victoria)
- Microcybe pauciflora Turcz. — yellow microcybe (Western Australia, South Australia, Victoria)
