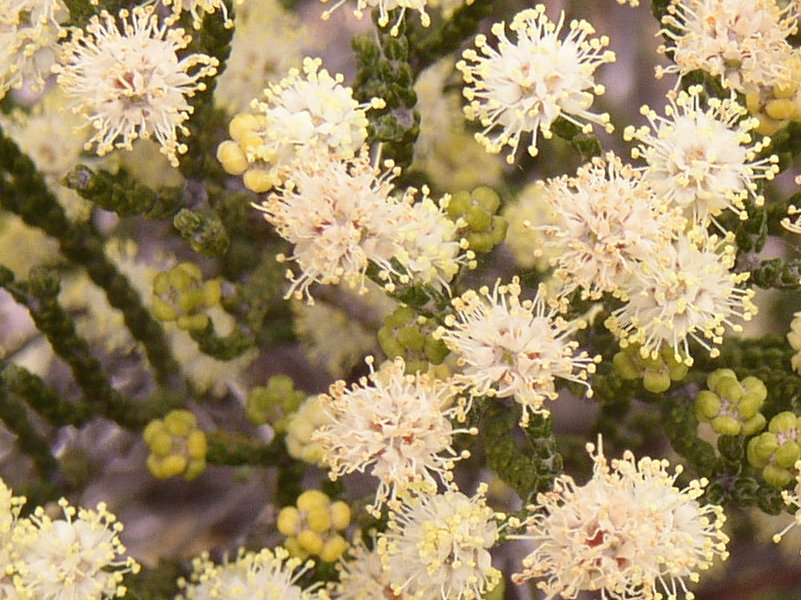
- Microcybe multiflora subsp. baccharoides

Scientific classification
- Kingdom: Plantae
- Clade: Tracheophytes
- Clade: Angiosperms
- Clade: Eudicots
- Clade: Rosids
- Order: Sapindales
- Family: Rutaceae
- Genus: Microcybe
- Species: M. multiflora

Binomial name
- Microcybe multiflora Turcz.

Synonyms
- Eriostemon capitatus var. baccharoides F.Muell.

= Microcybe multiflora =

Species of plant

Microcybe multiflora is a small shrub in the family Rutaceae. The species is endemic to Australia. It usually grows to between 0.2 and 1 metre high and produces cream to yellow flowers.

The species was first formally described by the botanist Nicolai Stepanovitch Turczaninow in Bulletin de la Société Impériale des Naturalistes de Moscou in 1852.

Two subspecies are recognised:

- M.multiflora subsp. baccharoides (F.Muell.) Paul G. Wilson — Scale-leaf Microcybe
- M. multiflora Turcz. subsp. multiflora — Red Microcybe

The species occurs in southern Western Australia, southern South Australia, and western Victoria.
