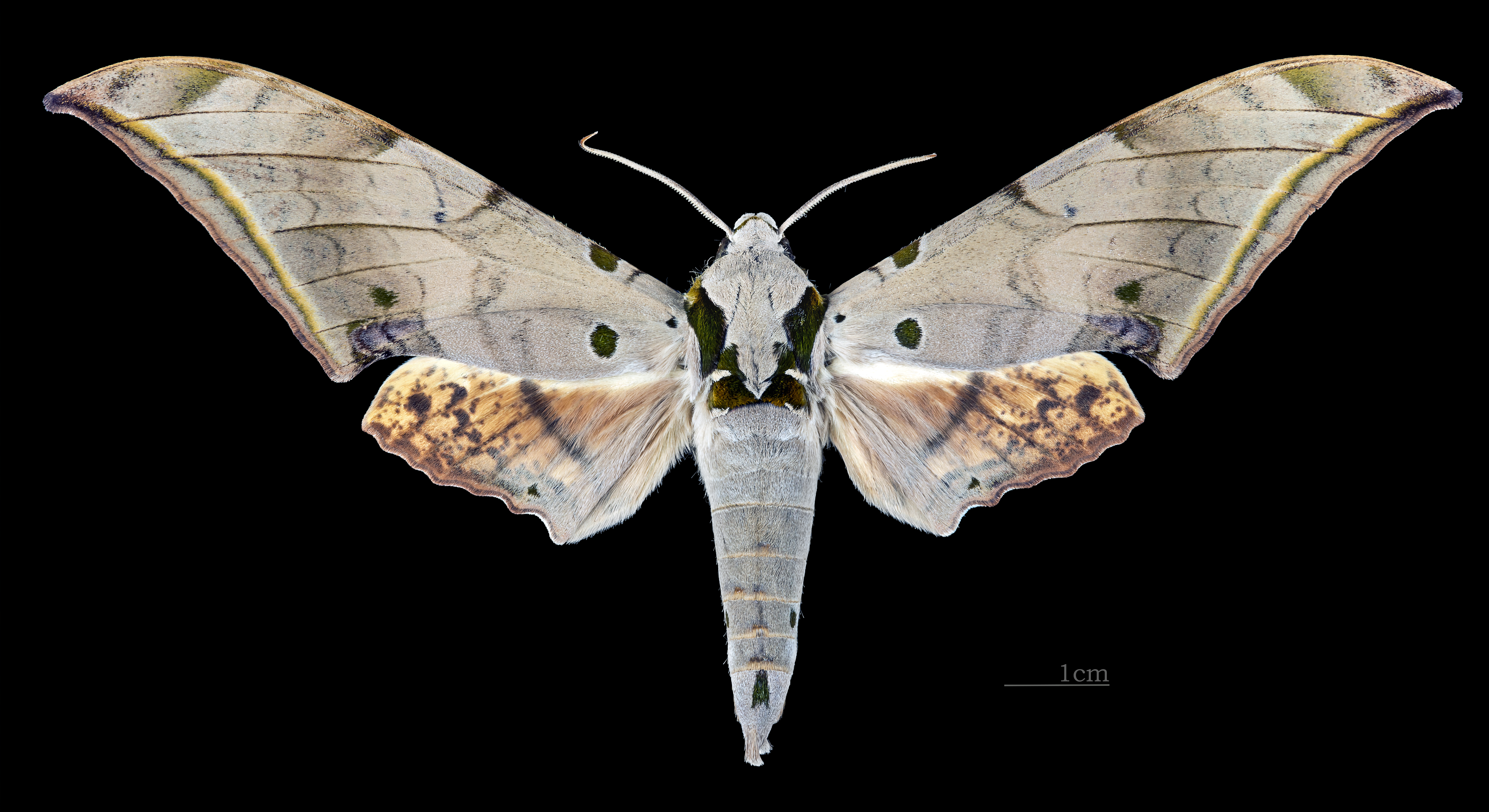
- Ambulyx sericeipennis sericeipennis, dorsal view
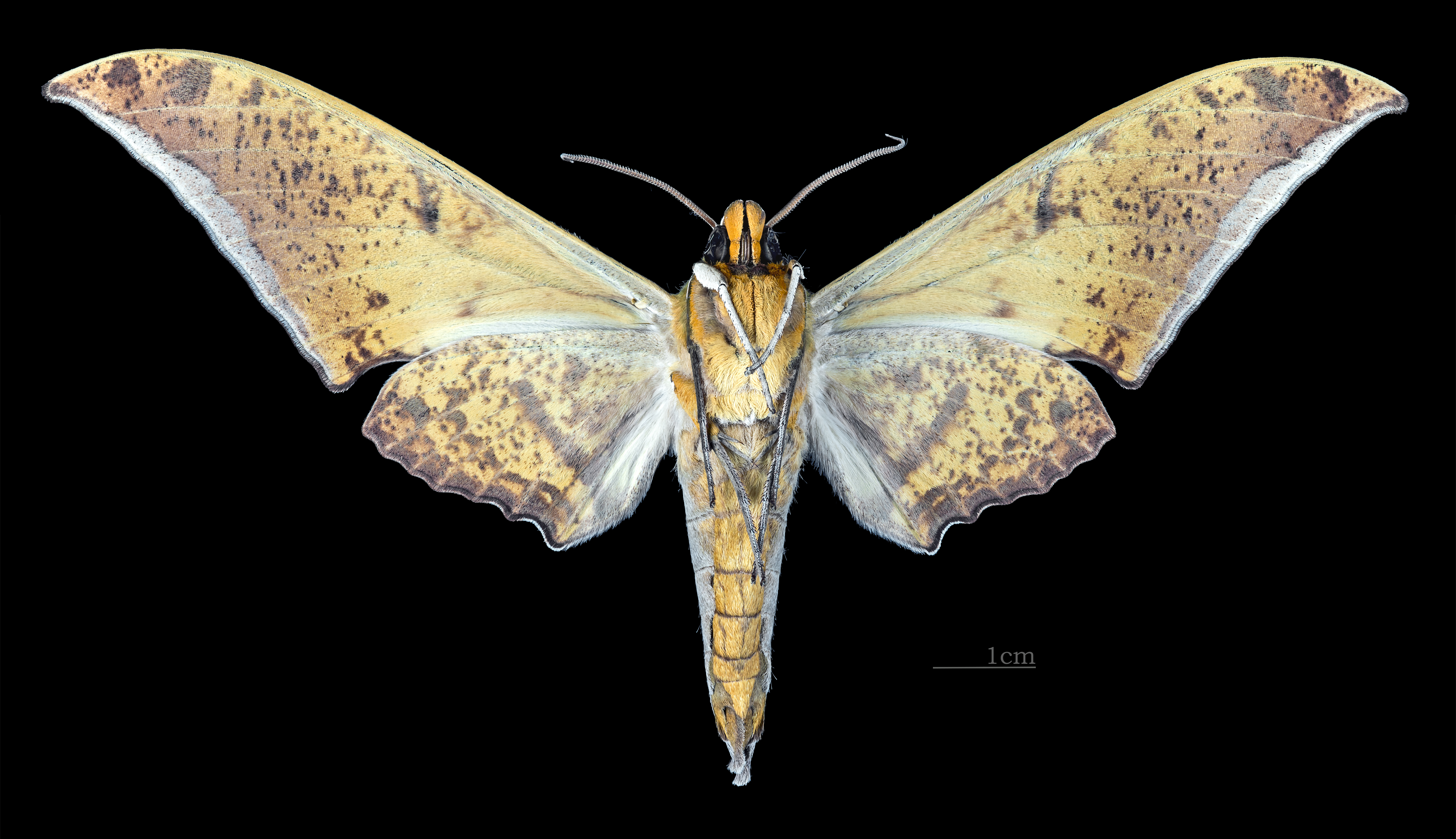
- Ambulyx sericeipennis sericeipennis, ventral view

Scientific classification
- Kingdom: Animalia
- Phylum: Arthropoda
- Class: Insecta
- Order: Lepidoptera
- Family: Sphingidae
- Genus: Ambulyx
- Species: A. sericeipennis

Binomial name
- Ambulyx sericeipennis Butler, 1875

Synonyms
- Ambulyx okurai (Okano, 1959); Oxyambulyx amaculata Meng, 1989; Oxyambulyx sericeipennis agana Jordan, 1929; Oxyambulyx sericeipennis brunnea (Mell, 1922); Oxyambulyx sericeipennis reducta (Mell, 1922); Oxyambulyx sericeipennis javanica Clark, 1930; Oxyambulyx sericeipennis joiceyi Clark, 1923; Oxyambulyx sericeipennis luzoni Clark, 1924

= Ambulyx sericeipennis =

Species of moth

Ambulyx sericeipennis, the common gliding hawkmoth, is a species of moth of the family Sphingidae first described by Arthur Gardiner Butler in 1875. It is found from northern Pakistan and northern India eastwards across Nepal, Sikkim, Bhutan, Myanmar, Thailand, Laos, Cambodia and Vietnam to central and southern China and Taiwan.

The wingspan is 95–124 mm. It is similar to Ambulyx maculifera.

The larvae have been recorded feeding on Juglans regia, Engelhardia spicata, Elaeocarpus, Quercus, Myrica nagi, Betula alnoides and Rhus species.

== Subspecies ==
- Ambulyx sericeipennis sericeipennis
- Ambulyx sericeipennis javanica (Clark, 1930) (Java)
- Ambulyx sericeipennis joiceyi (Clark 1923) (Malaysia, Borneo, Sumatra, Vietnam and Laos)
- Ambulyx sericeipennis luzoni (Clark, 1924) (Luzon)
- Ambulyx sericeipennis okurai (Okano, 1959) (Taiwan)
- Ambulyx sericeipennis palawanica Brechlin, 2009 (Palawan)
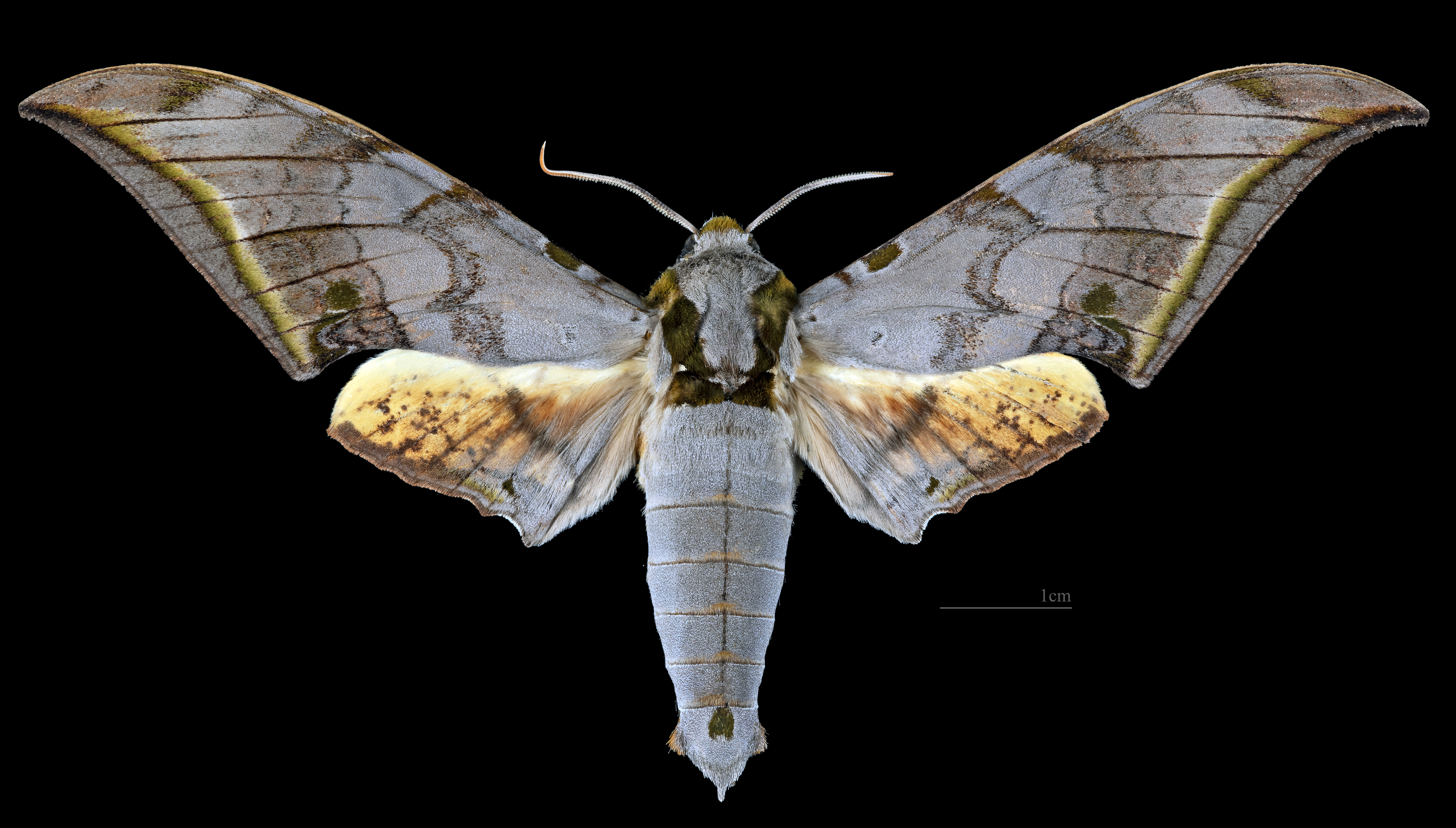
Ambulyx sericeipennis joiceyi male, dorsal view

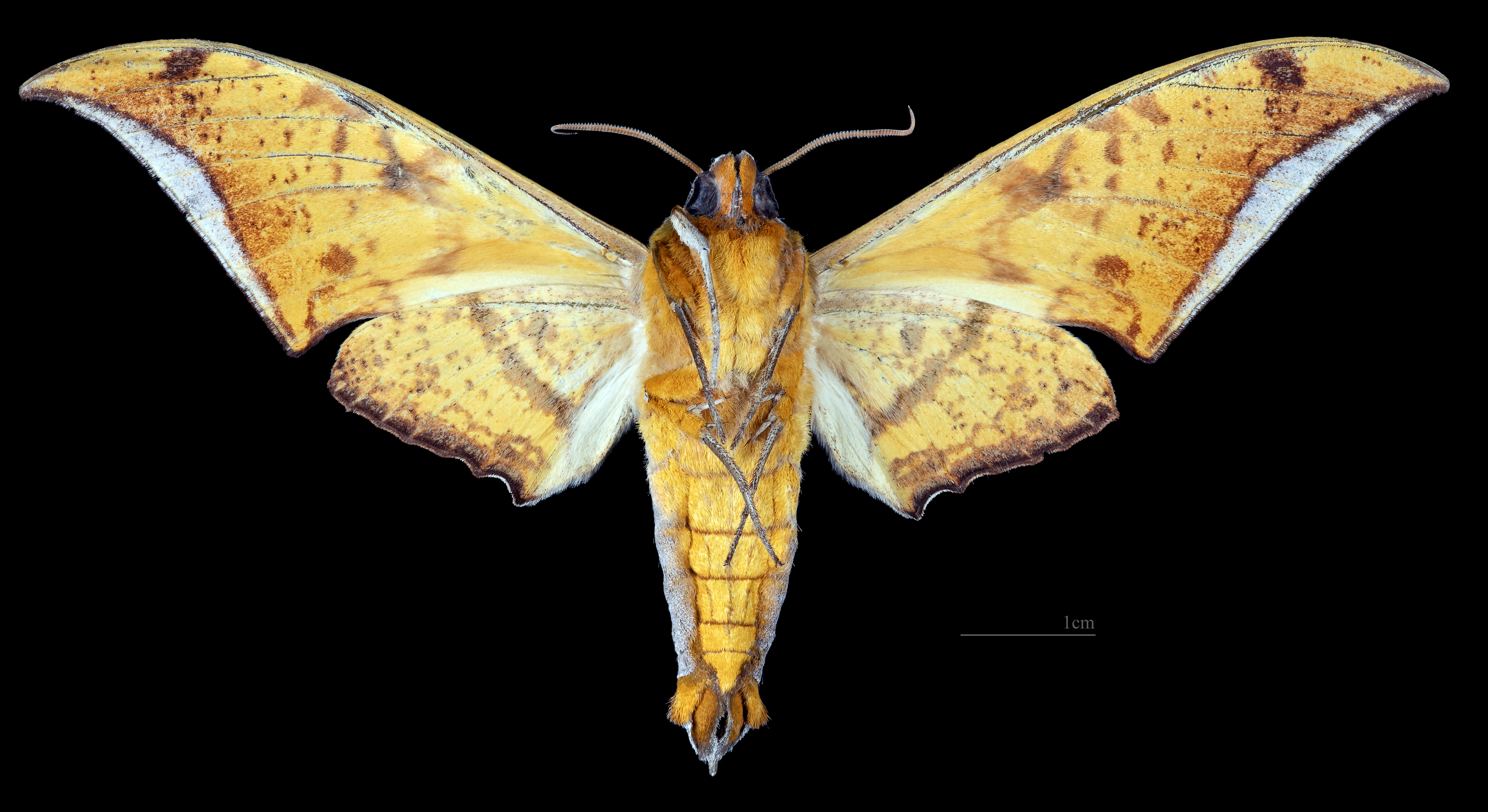
Ambulyx sericeipennis joiceyi male, ventral view

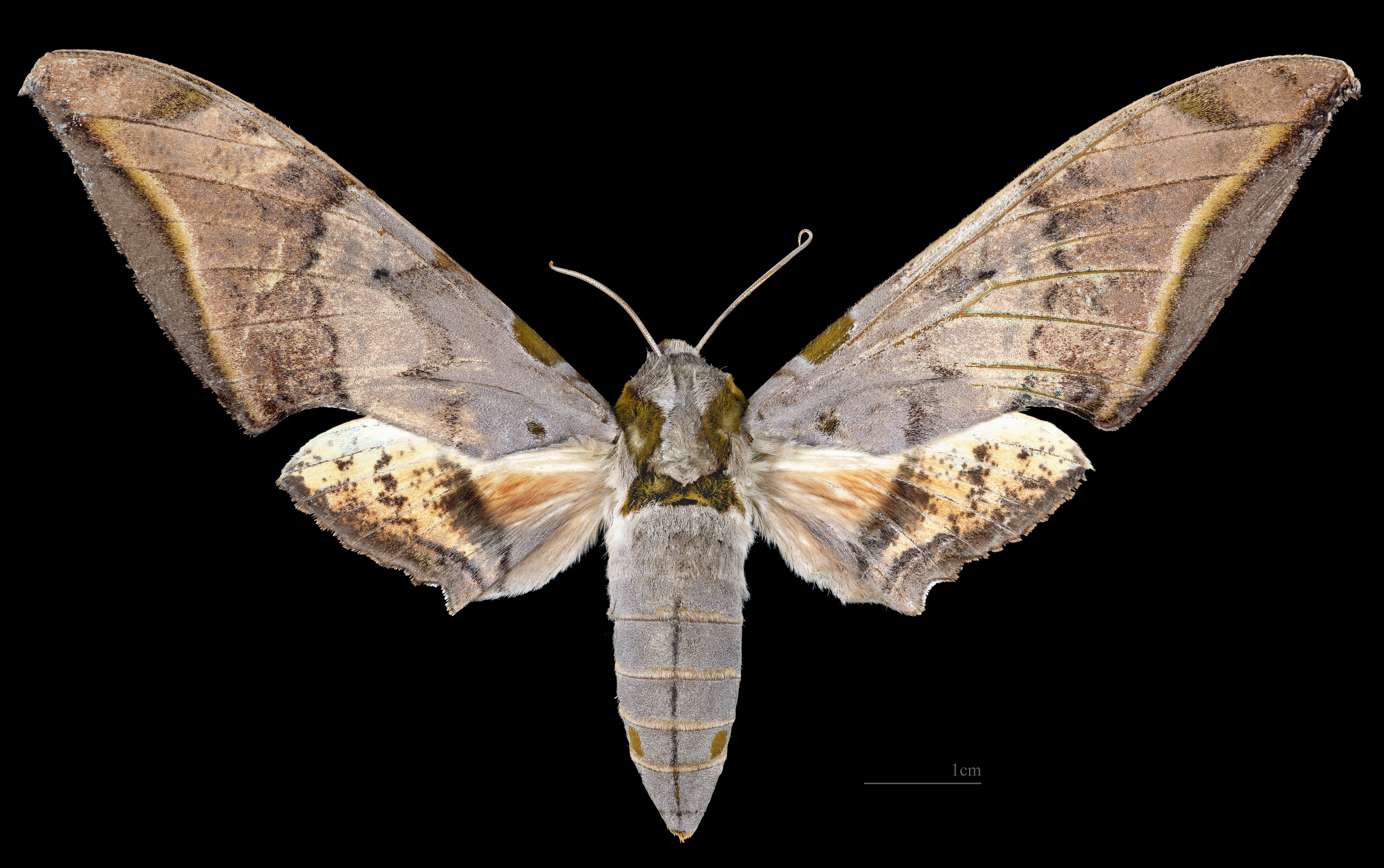
Ambulyx sericeipennis joiceyi female, dorsal view

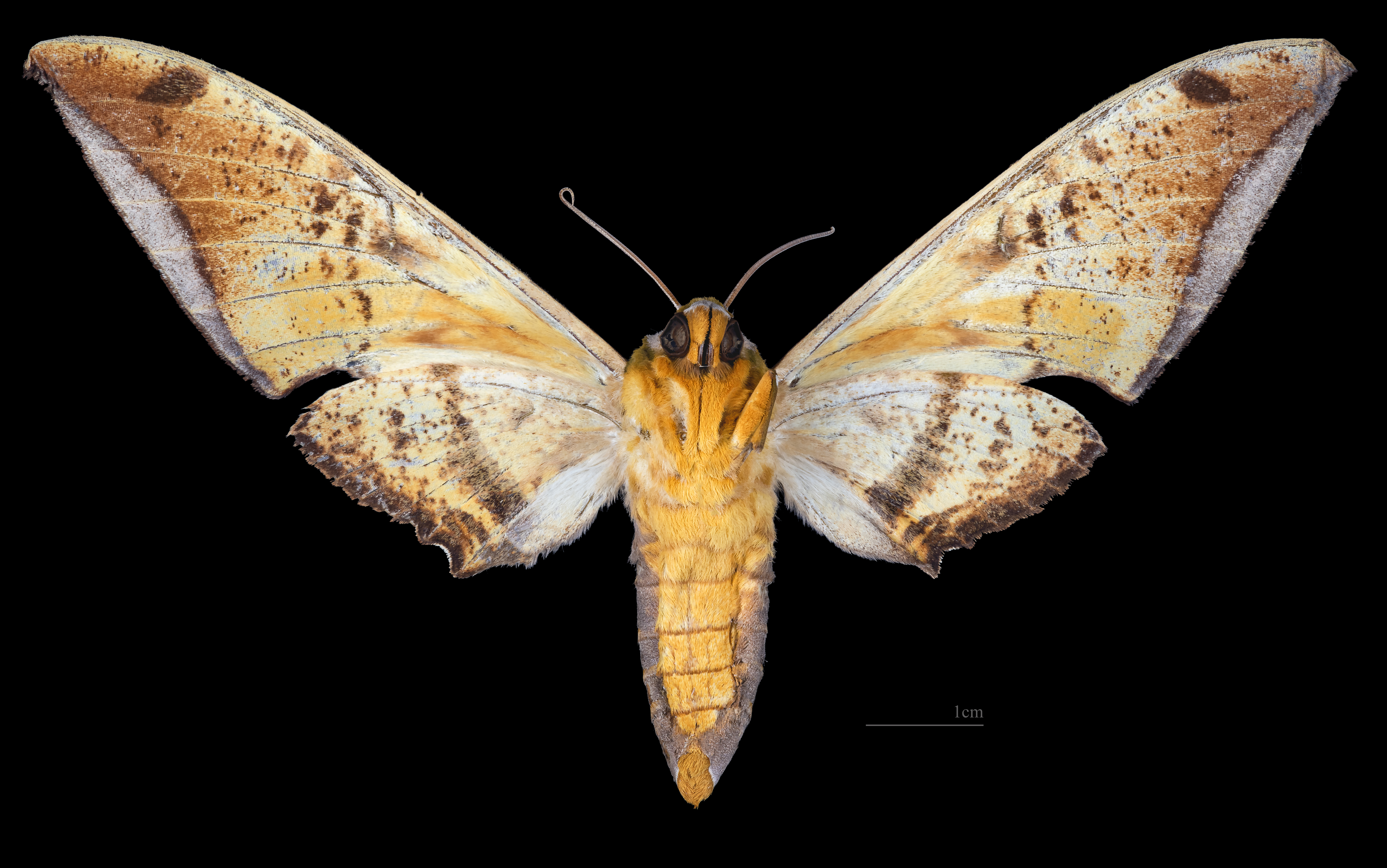
Ambulyx sericeipennis joiceyi female, ventral view
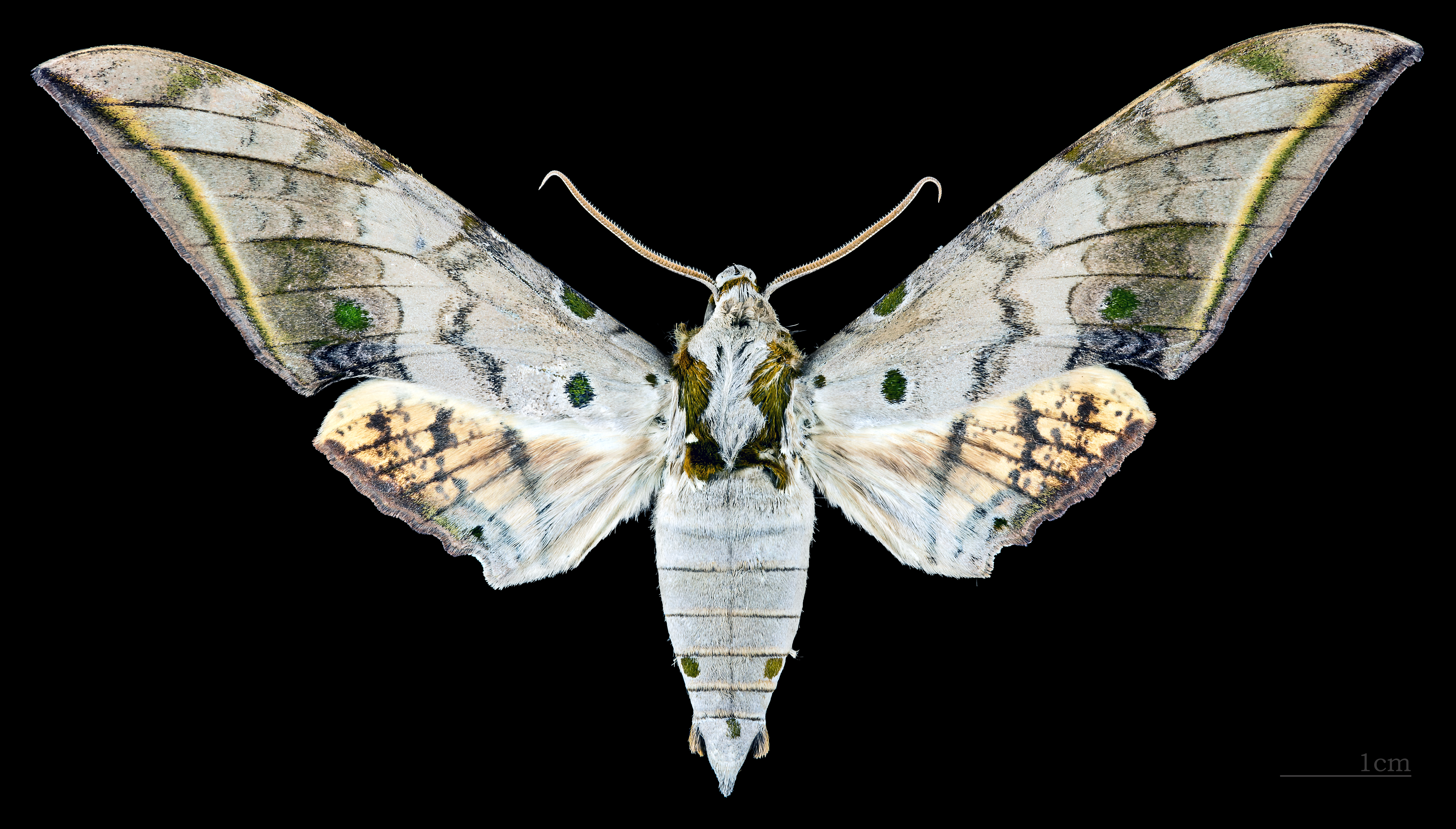
Male Ambulyx sericeipennis okurai, dorsal view

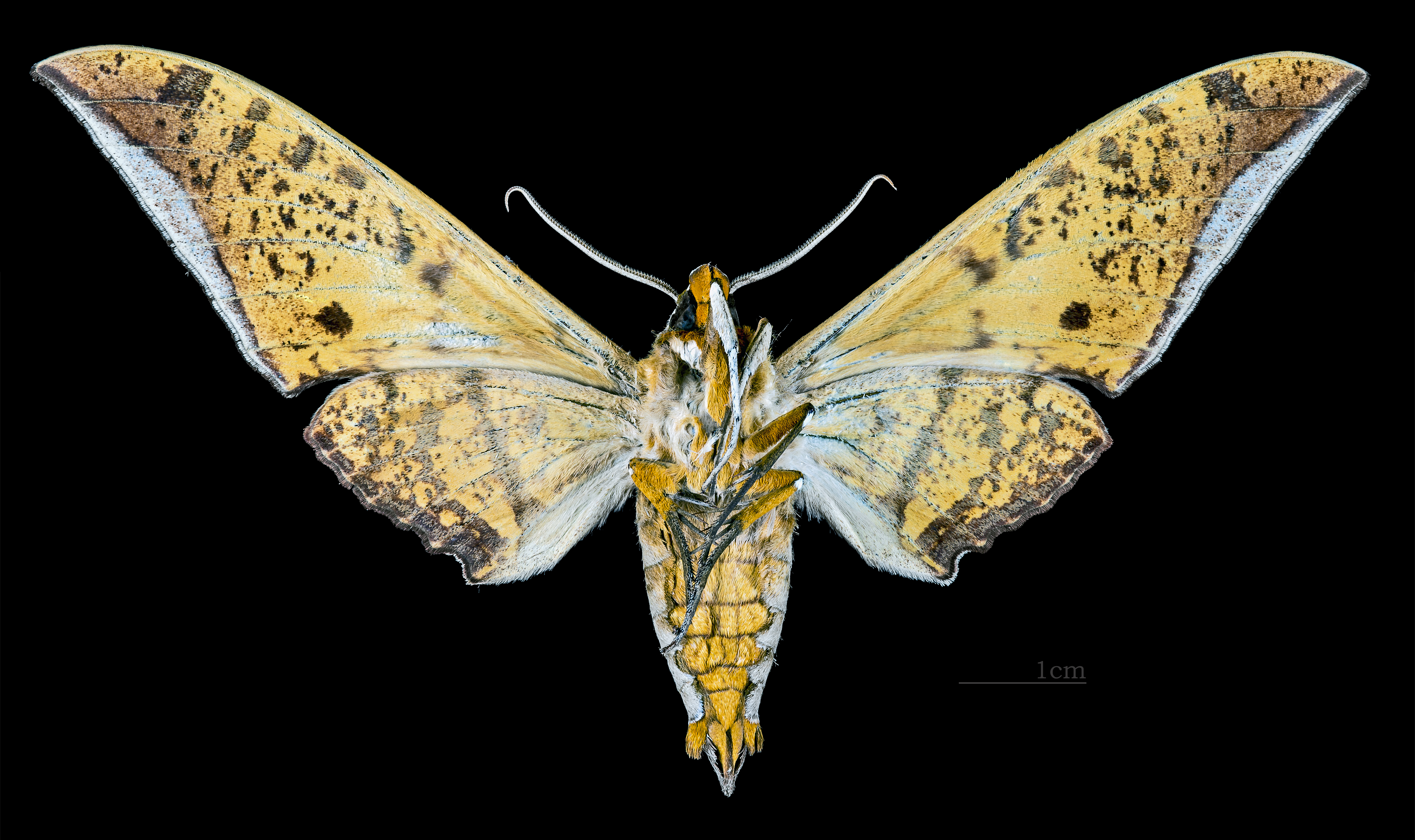
Male Ambulyx sericeipennis okurai, ventral view
