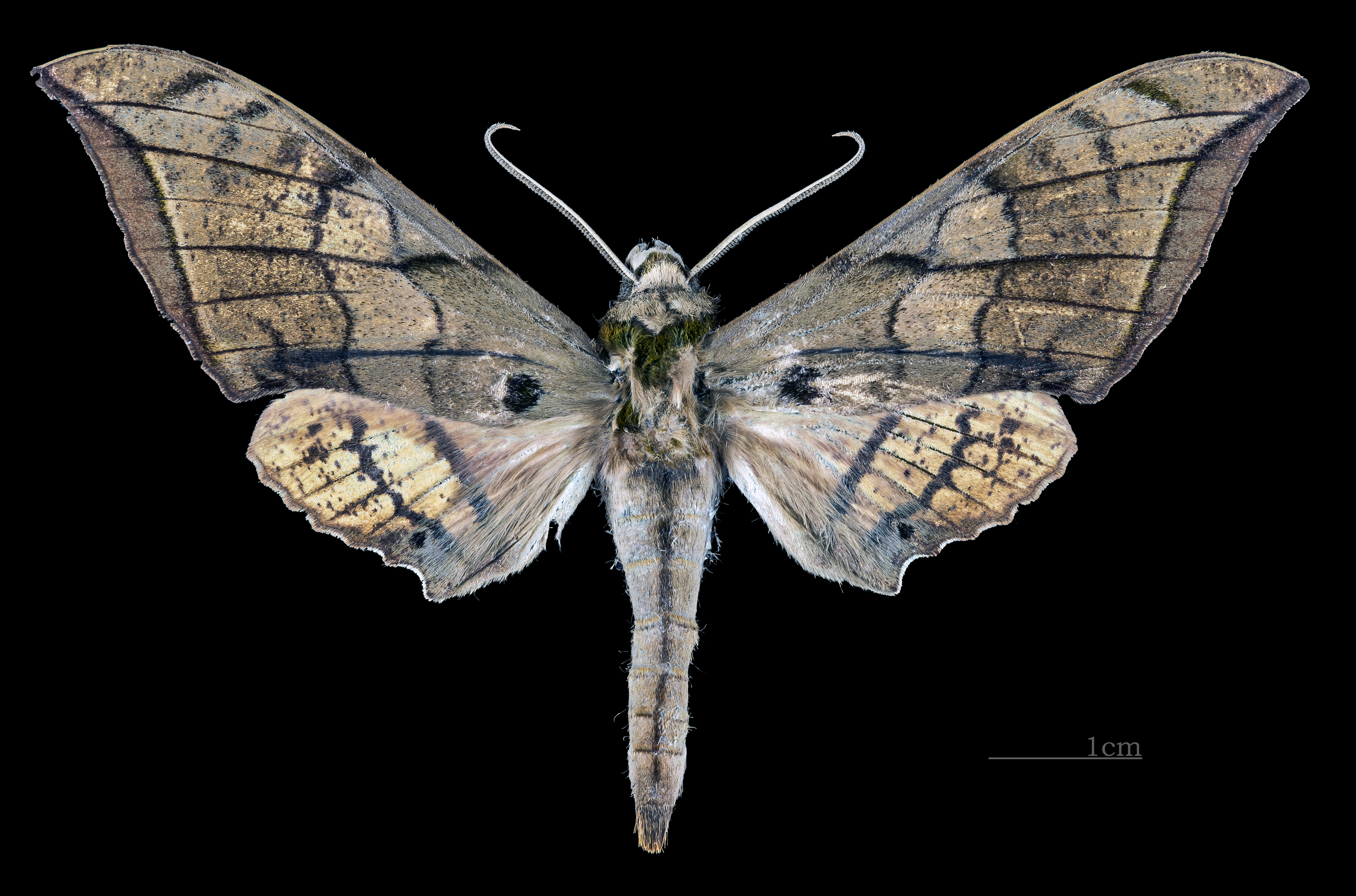
- Ambulyx johnsoni dorsal
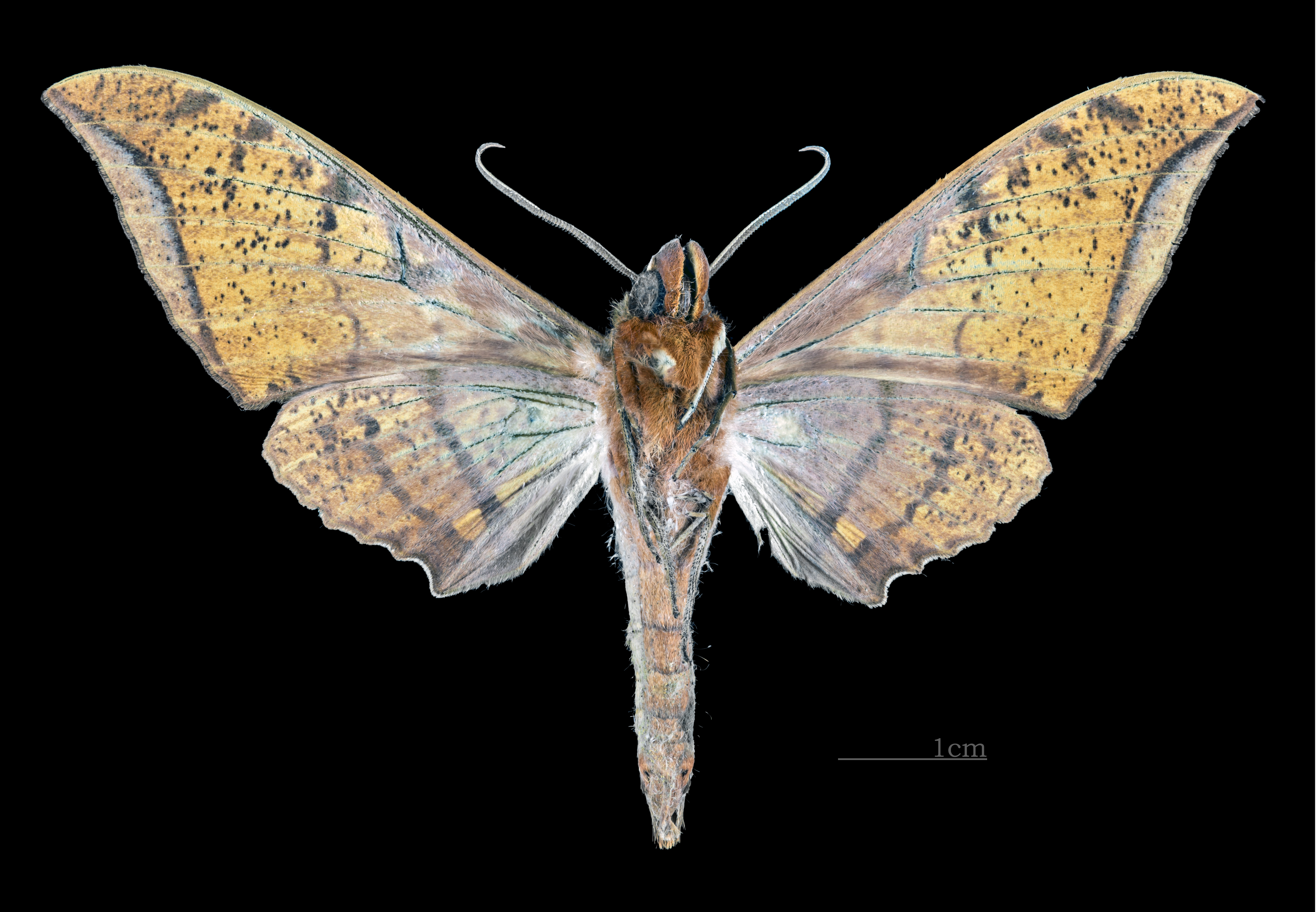
- Ambulyx johnsoni ventral

Scientific classification
- Kingdom: Animalia
- Phylum: Arthropoda
- Class: Insecta
- Order: Lepidoptera
- Family: Sphingidae
- Genus: Ambulyx
- Species: A. johnsoni

Binomial name
- Ambulyx johnsoni (Clark, 1917)

Synonyms
- Oxyambulyx johnsoni Clark, 1917

= Ambulyx johnsoni =

Species of moth

Ambulyx johnsoni is a species of moth of the family Sphingidae.

== Distribution ==
It is known from the Philippines.

== Description ==
The wingspan is about 50 mm. It is similar to Ambulyx liturata but smaller, the upperside and underside of the wings is more yellowish and the underside of the palps, thorax, abdomen and bases of both wings are pinkish. The forewing upperside submarginal line is close to the fringe posteriorly both dorsally and ventrally and the pale band just proximal to the submarginal dark band is less prominent than in Ambulyx liturata.

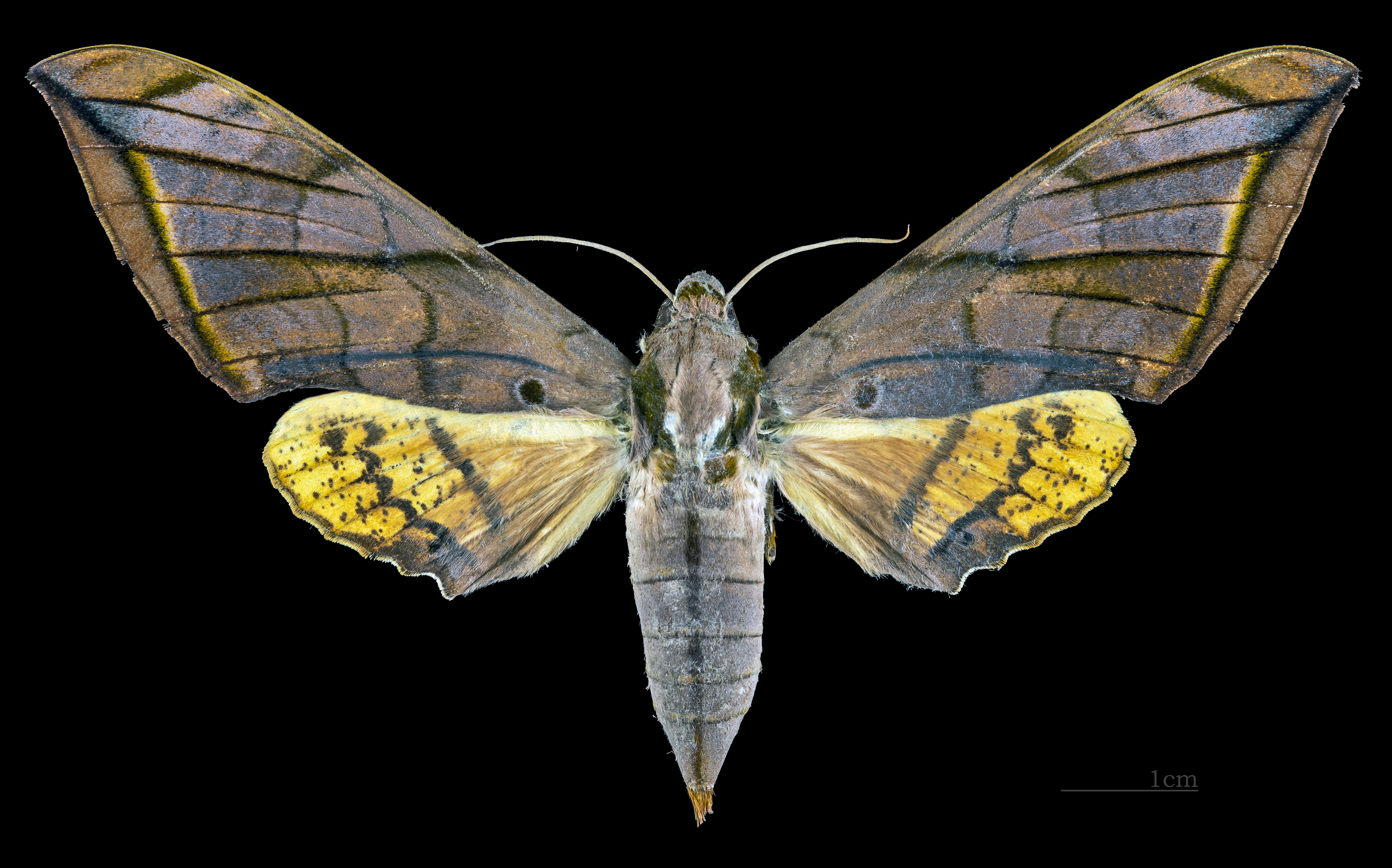
Female dorsal MHNT

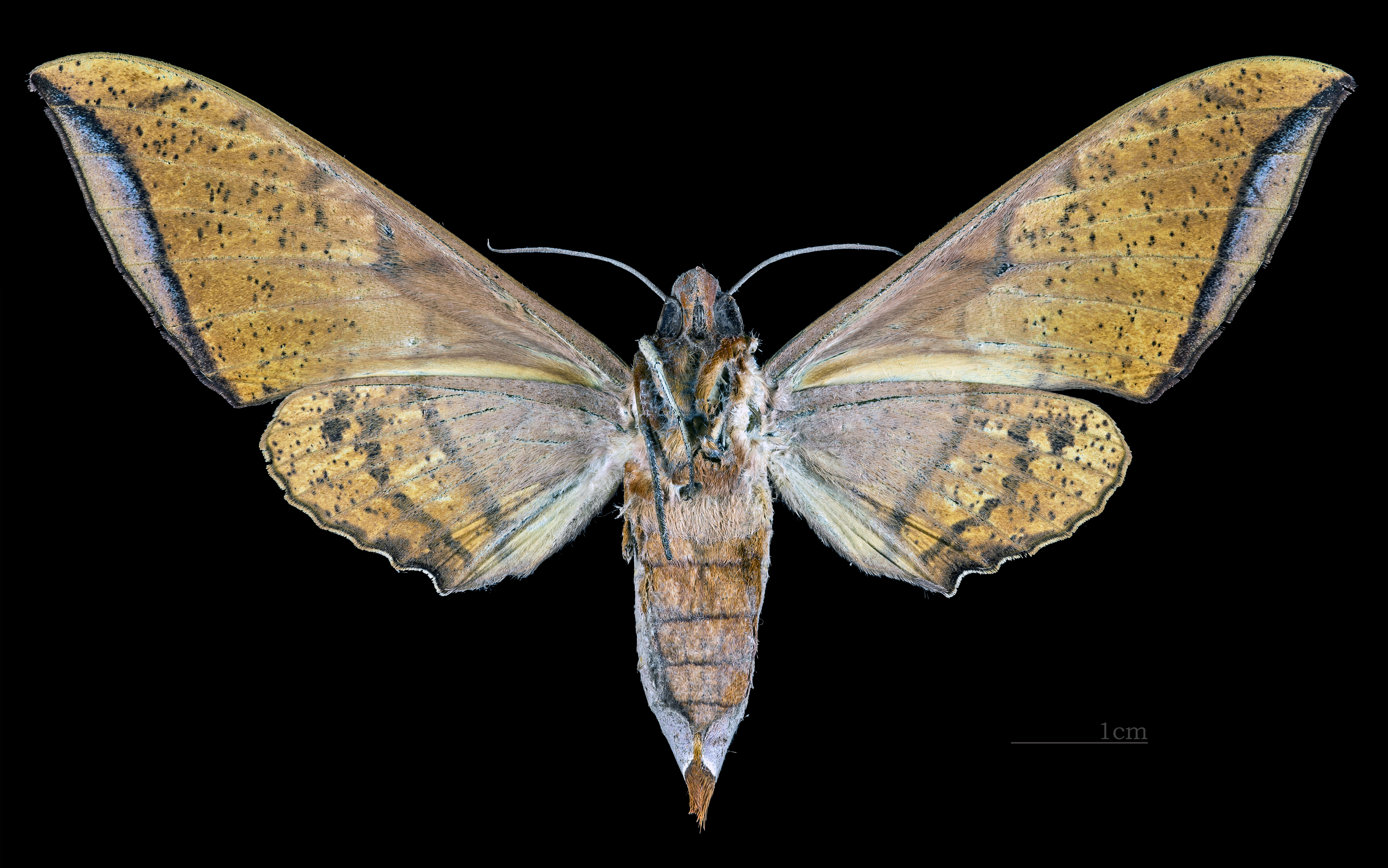
Female ventral MHNT
