= N. maxima =

N. maxima may refer to:

- Nageia maxima, a conifer endemic to Malaysia
- Nepenthes maxima, a pitcher plant
- Nihonia maxima, a sea snail
