= Nageia motleyi =

Conservation status
- Vulnerable (IUCN 3.1)

Scientific classification
- Kingdom: Plantae
- Clade: Embryophytes
- Clade: Tracheophytes
- Clade: Spermatophytes
- Clade: Gymnospermae
- Division: Pinophyta
- Class: Pinopsida
- Order: Araucariales
- Family: Podocarpaceae
- Genus: Nageia
- Species: N. motleyi

Binomial name
- Nageia motleyi (Parl.) de Laub.

Synonyms
- Agathis motleyi (Parl.) Warb.; Dammara motleyi Parl.; Decussocarpus motleyi (Parl.) de Laub.; Podocarpus beccarii Parl.; Podocarpus motleyi (Parl.) Dummer

Species of conifer

Nageia motleyi is a species of conifer in the family Podocarpaceae. It is a tree native to Brunei, Indonesia (Borneo and Sumatra), Malaysia, and Peninsular Thailand.
