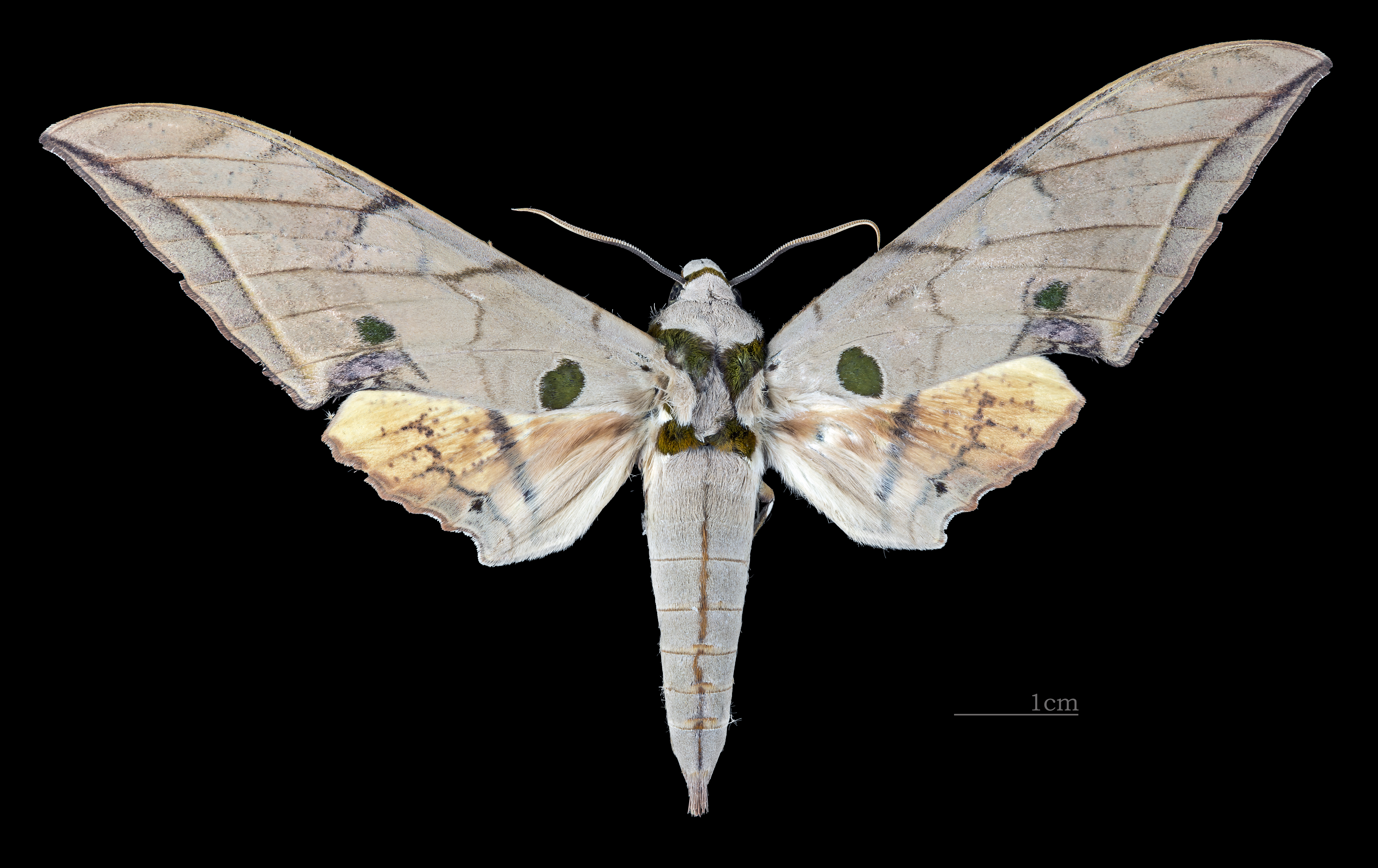
- Male dorsal
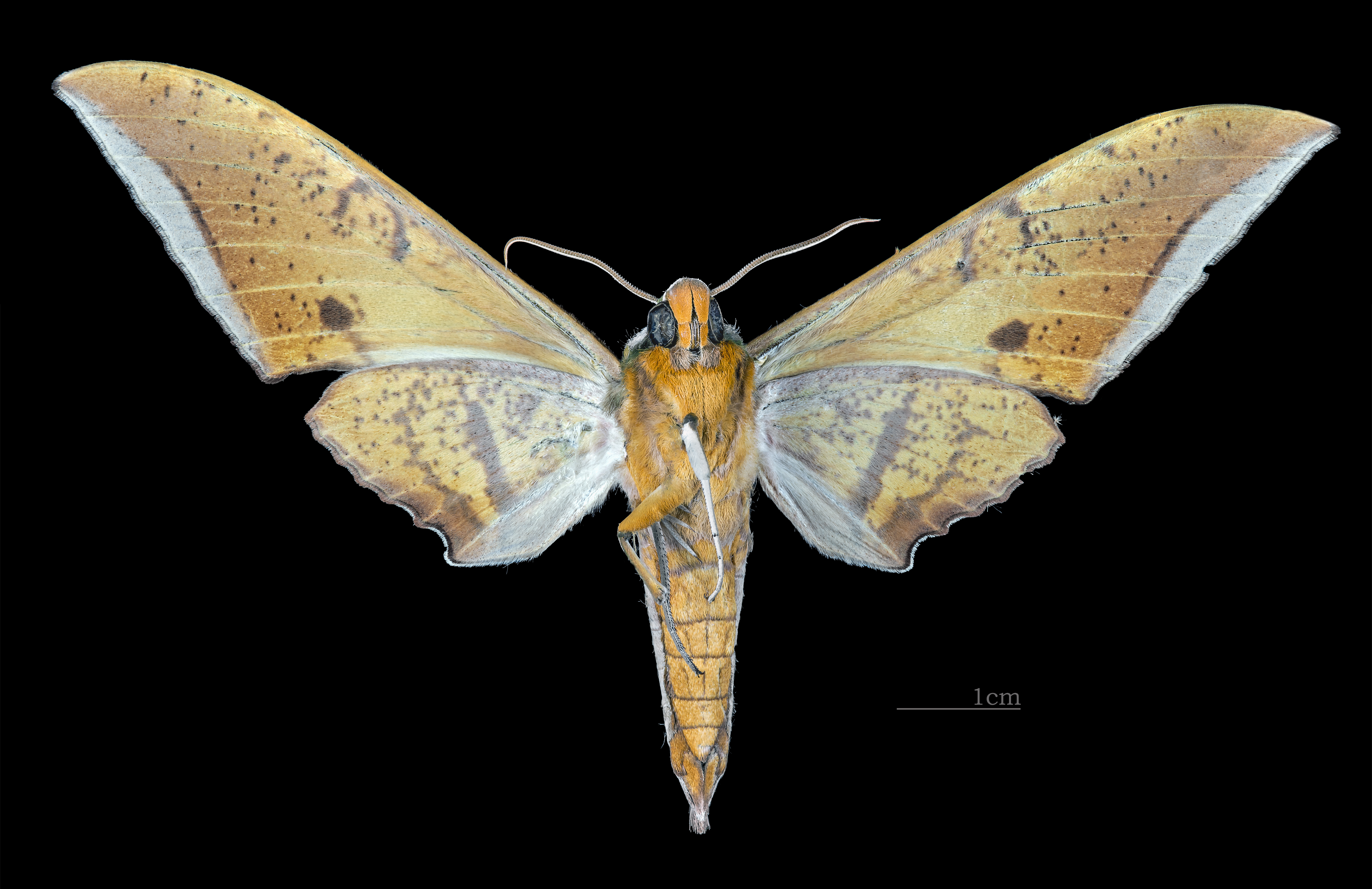
- Male ventral

Scientific classification
- Kingdom: Animalia
- Phylum: Arthropoda
- Class: Insecta
- Order: Lepidoptera
- Family: Sphingidae
- Genus: Ambulyx
- Species: A. liturata

Binomial name
- Ambulyx liturata Butler, 1875

Synonyms
- Ambulyx rhodoptera Butler, 1875

= Ambulyx liturata =

Species of moth

Ambulyx liturata is a species of moth of the family Sphingidae first described by Arthur Gardiner Butler in 1875.

== Distribution ==
It is found from Nepal, the north-eastern India states of Sikkim and Assam, Myanmar, Thailand and Vietnam to Fujian and Hong Kong in China.

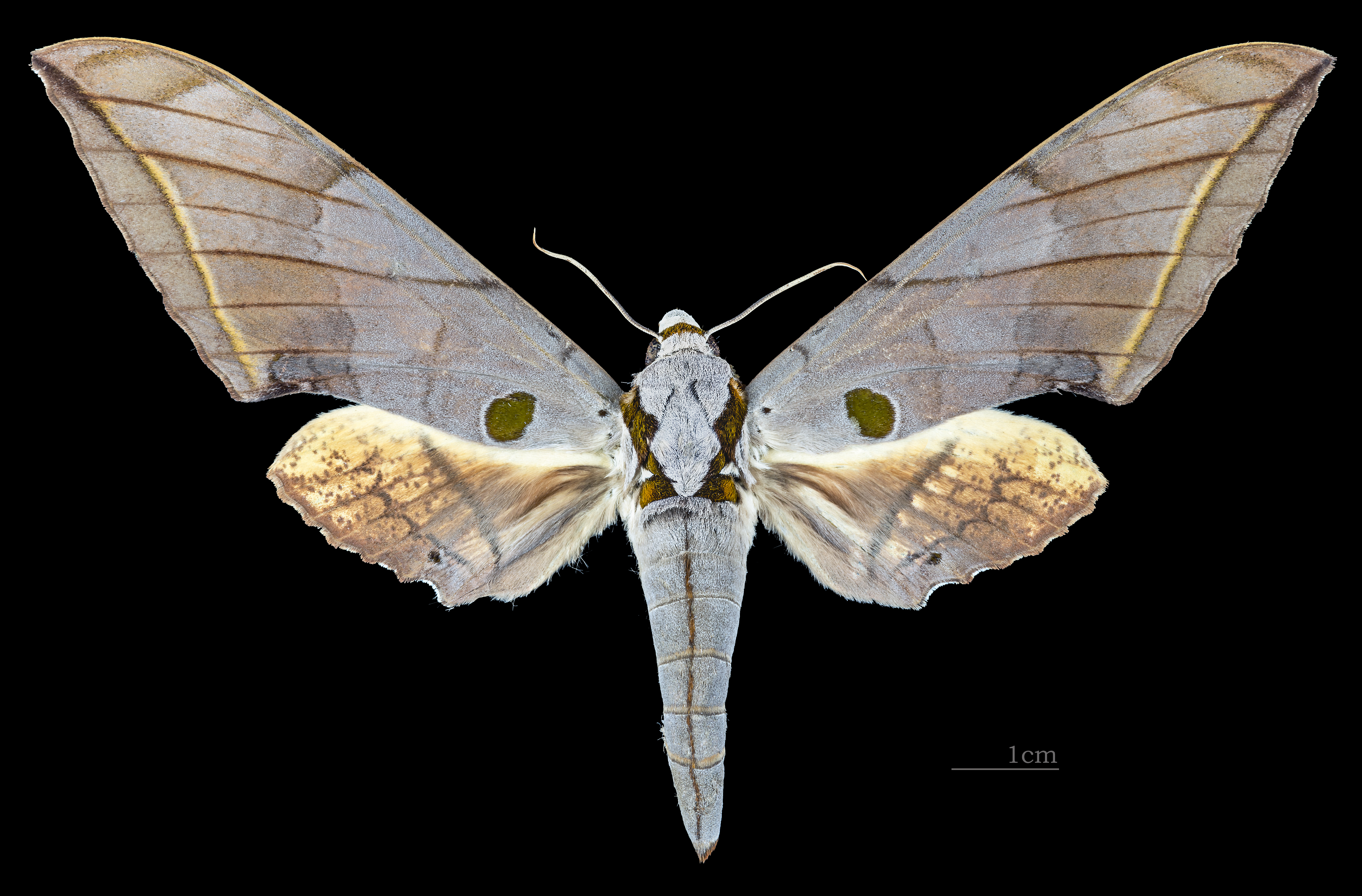
Female dorsal view

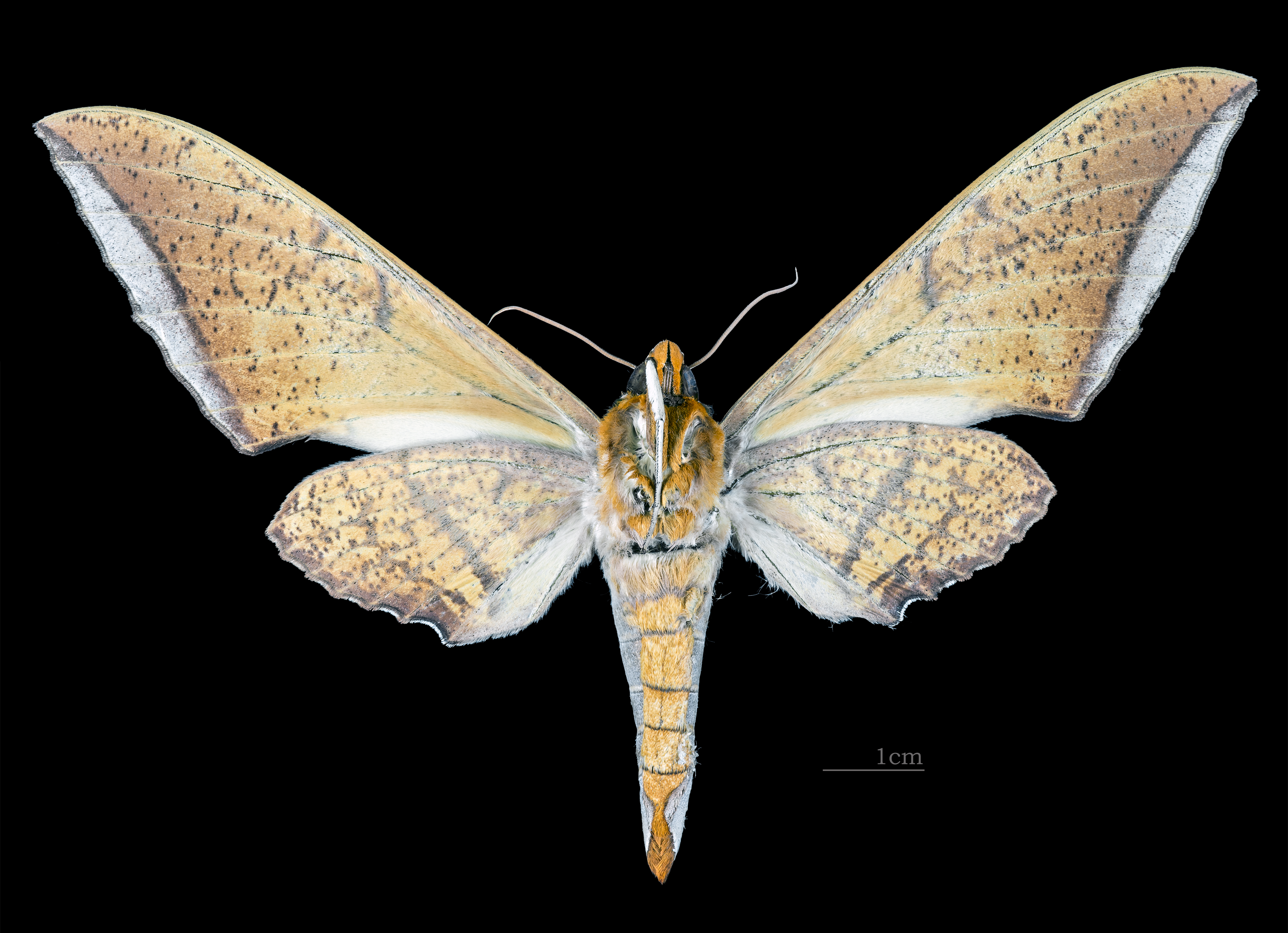
Female ventral view

== Description ==
The wingspan is 106–134 mm. It is similar to Ambulyx maculifera, but can be distinguished by the absence of a subbasal costal patch on the forewing upperside.

== Biology ==
The larvae have been recorded feeding on Canarium album in China.
