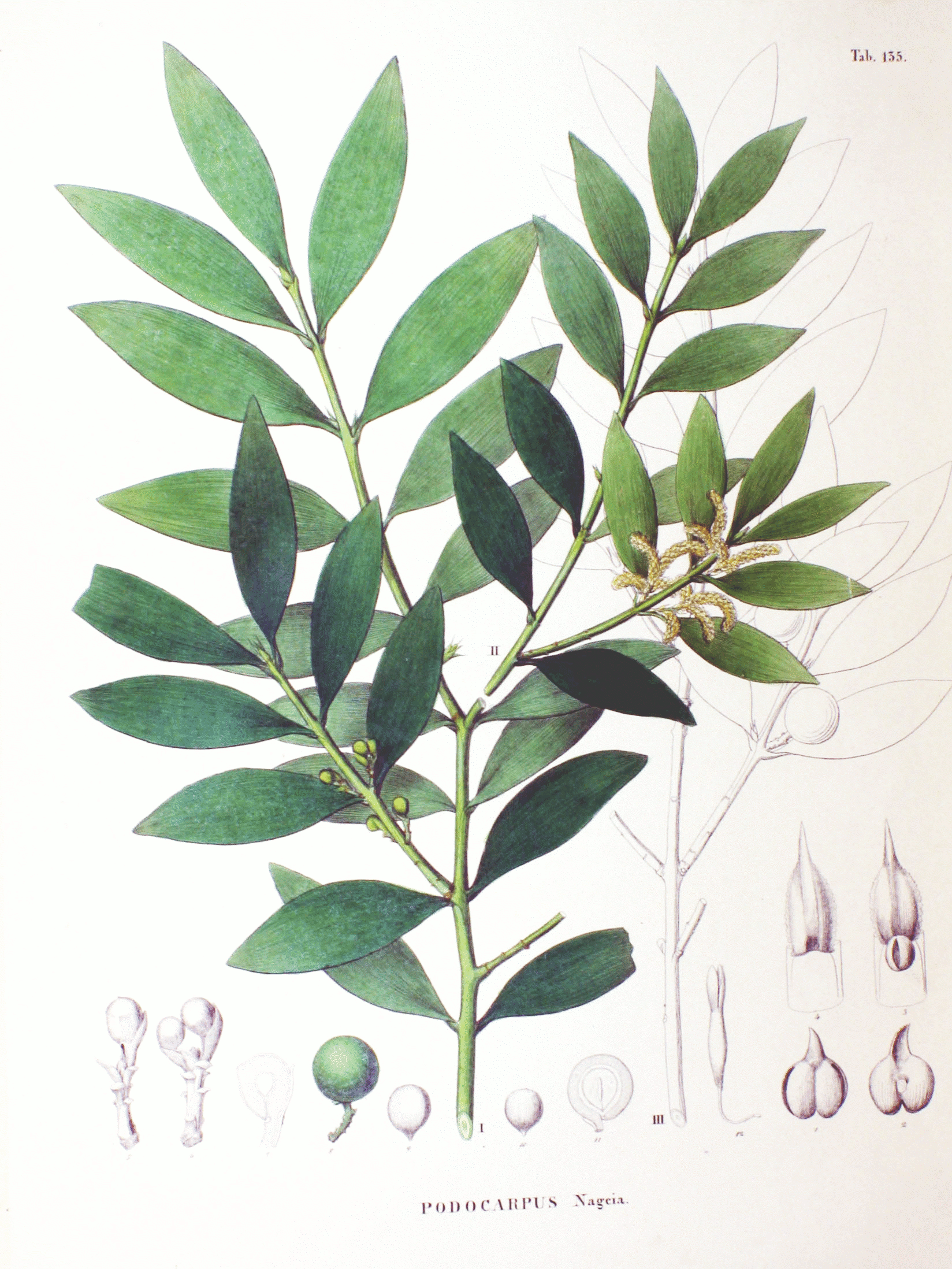
- Nageia nagi

Scientific classification
- Kingdom: Plantae
- Clade: Tracheophytes
- Clade: Gymnosperms
- Division: Pinophyta
- Class: Pinopsida
- Order: Araucariales
- Family: Podocarpaceae
- Genus: Nageia; Gaertn. 1788 not Roxb. 1832 (syn of Putranjiva in Putranjivaceae)

Type species
- Nageia nagi (Thunberg) C.E.O. Kuntze

Species
- See text.

= Nageia =

Nageia Temporal range: Early Cretaceous–Recent

Genus of conifers in the family Podocarpaceae

Nageia is a genus of conifers belonging to the podocarp family Podocarpaceae. Nageia includes 6 species of shrubs and trees, from one to 54 meters in height. A 2009 treatment of the genus recognized five species. Some authors consider Nageia formosensis to be a separate species from Nageia nagi, thus recognizing six species. The podocarp genera have been reshuffled by various botanists. Most recently, several species formerly classed as Nageia were moved to the new genus Retrophyllum, while Nageia falcata and Nageia mannii were moved to the new genus Afrocarpus.

== Description ==
Nageia are evergreen woody plants that usually grow as trees but may also rarely be shrubs, varying in height from one to 54 meters. The branching is irregular. The thin and hard bark often peels with scale-like plates.

The leaves are simple and flat. The phyllotaxis or leaf arrangement can be spiral or subopposite and nearly decussate. The leaf petioles are frequently twisted so the leaves form a flat plane around the shoot. The leaf blade is elliptic, ovate-elliptic or lanceolate in shape. Juvenile leaves are similar in shape to the adult leaves but may be larger or smaller depending on the species. The leaves have multiple parallel longitudinal veins converging toward the ends. Stomata may be found on either both surfaces of the leaf or only the abaxial or underside. The leaf surface is coriaceous.

Nageia are generally dioecious, with male pollen cones and female seed cones borne on separate individual plants but may sometimes be monoecious. The cones are pedunculate and develop from axillary buds.

The pollen cones are long and ovoid-cylindric in shape. They may be solitary or grow in small spicate groups of two to six cones. Each pollen cone has numerous spirally inserted microsporophylls. The microsprophylls may be triangular or apiculate in shape. Each of them has two basal pollen sacs with bisaccate pollen.

The seed cones are solitary and have long peduncles. They have several sterile and one or rarely two fertile scales, each fertile scale with one seed producing ovule. Depending on the species, as the cone matures, the sterile scales may fuse and become fleshy as in the closely related Podocarpus or they may wither. A part of the cone scale supporting the ovule develops into a drupe-like fleshy covering known as the epimatium. The fleshy parts of the cones attract birds, which then disperse the seeds in their droppings.

The species of Nageia are distinguished from similar Podocarpus and the other genera in the Podocarpaceae by their broad, flat subopposite leaves with no midrib, superficially similar to those of the unrelated Agathis (Araucariaceae). Nageia is the only genus in Podocarpaceae with multi-veined leaves.

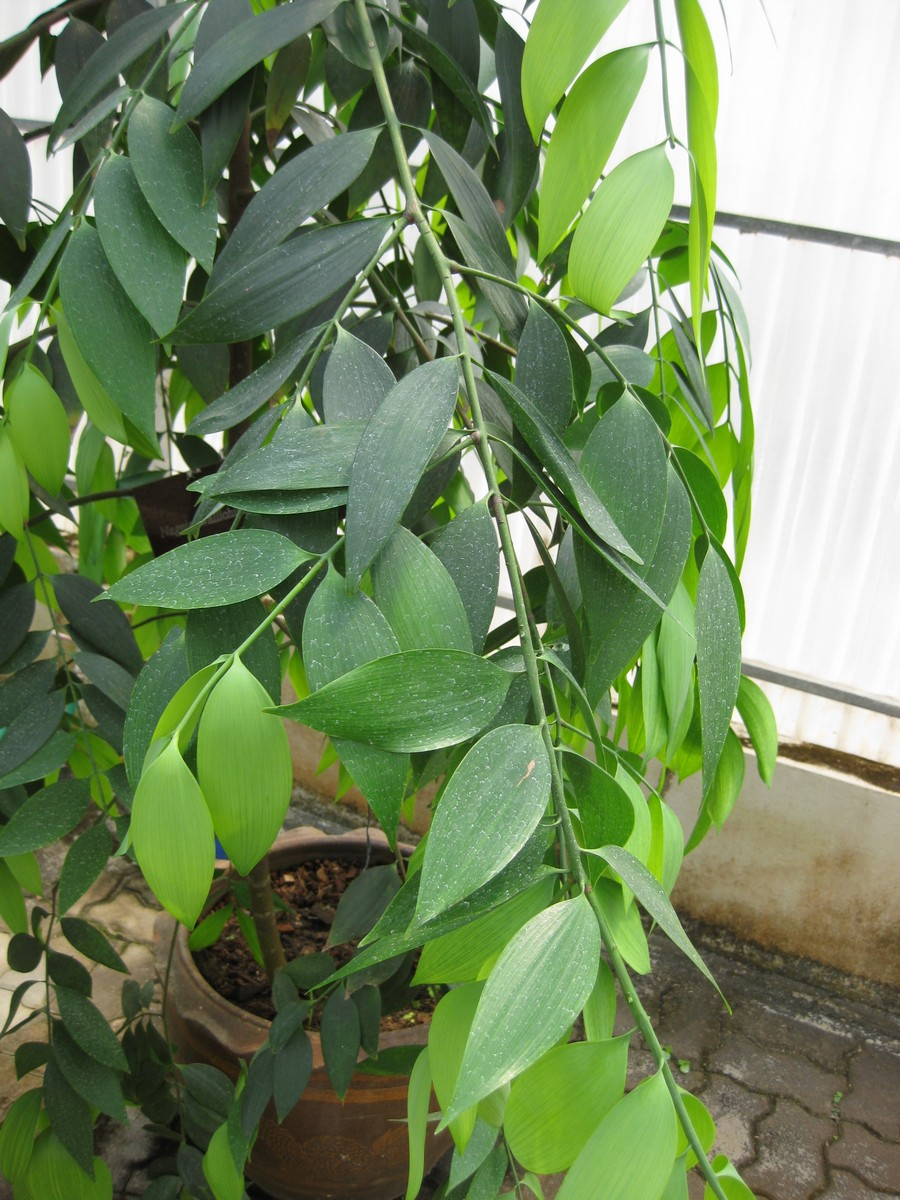
Broad leaves of N. wallichiana.

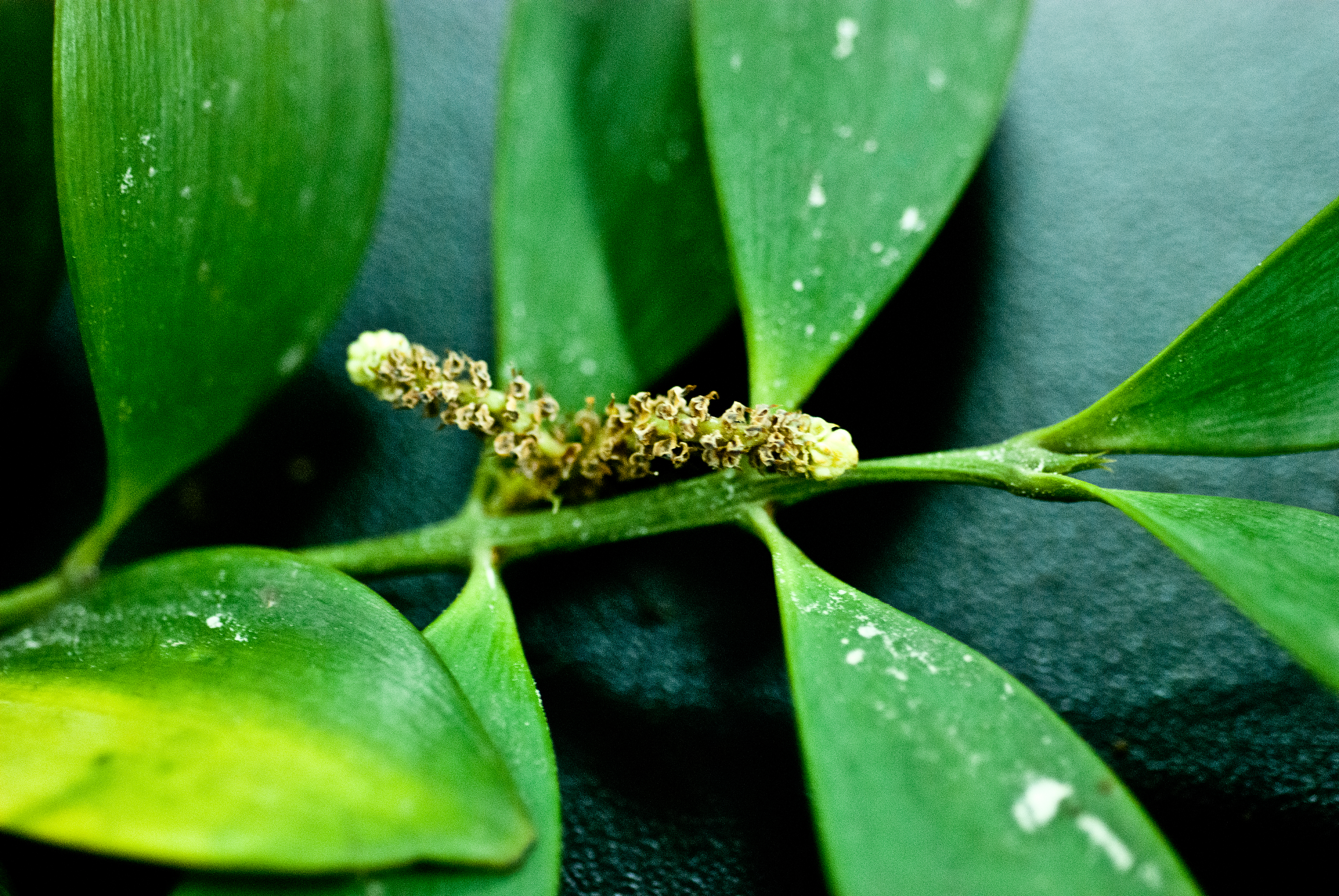
A pair of male cones of N. nagi.

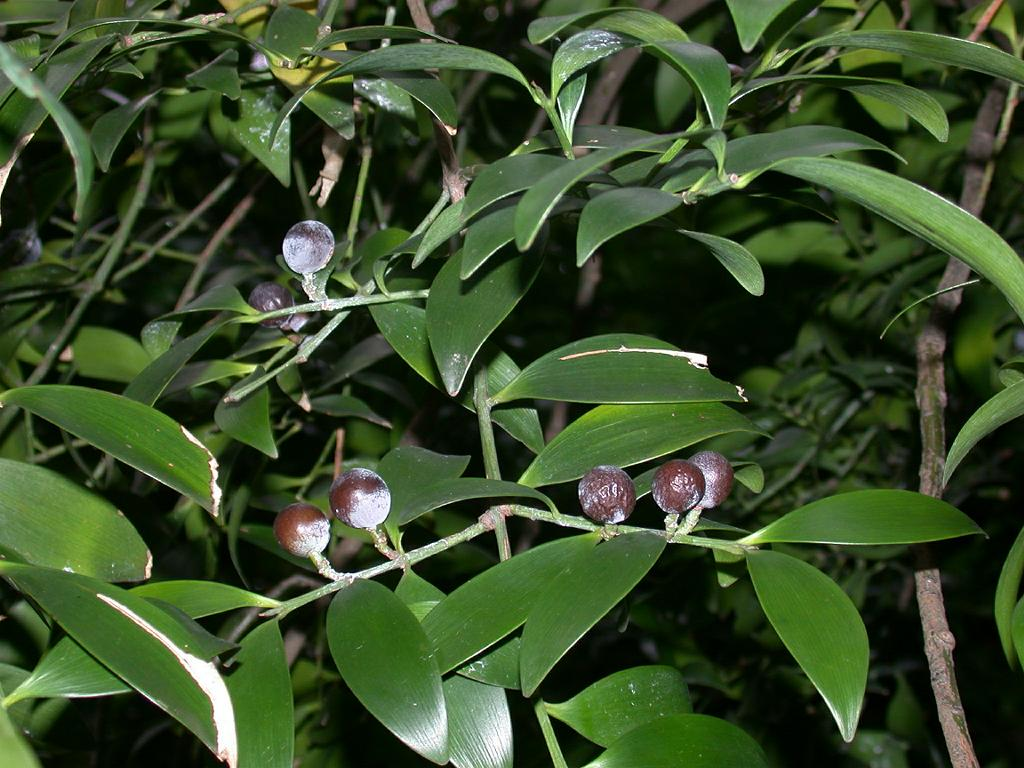
Female cones of N. nagi with a brown epimatium around the seed.

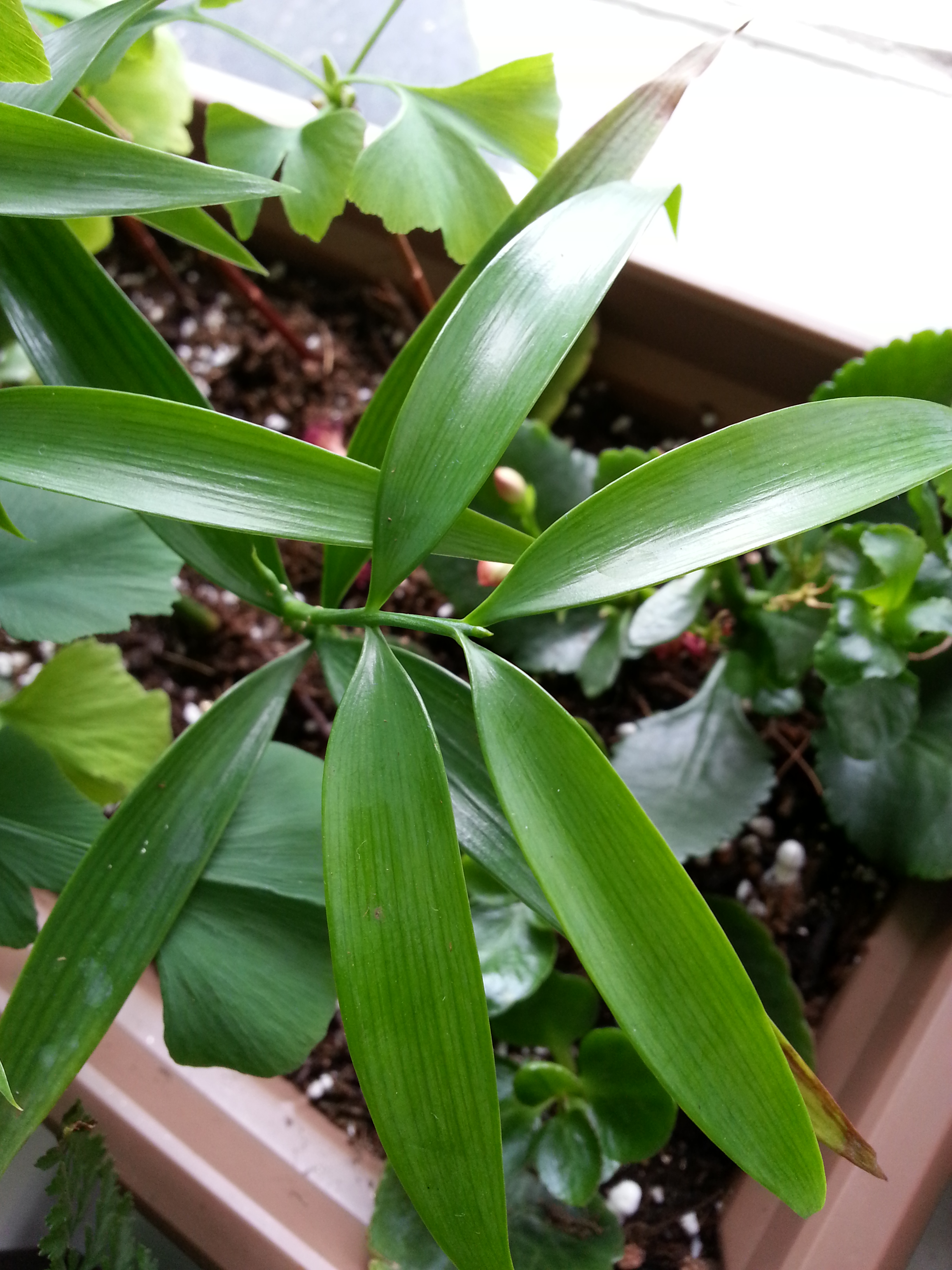
Nageia fleuryi seedling - note Ginkgo biloba seedling in background.

== Distribution ==
Nageia can be found in the tropical and subtropical moist broadleaf forests of Asia and Australasia, from Assam in eastern India across Southeast Asia to southern China and southern Japan, and across Malesia, from the Malay Peninsula across Indonesia to New Guinea and New Britain. An outpost of N. wallichiana is found in the South Western Ghats montane rain forests of southern India, where it is thought to be a relatively recent colonist in biogeographical terms.

Nageia, like many podocarps, can usually be found scattered throughout the forest mixed with other trees, and is rarely if ever found growing in pure stands. The wood is yellowish, typical of podocarps, and a few species are locally important for lumber.

The oldest fossils assigned to the genus are known from the Early Cretaceous of Japan, China and Russia. Other fossils are known from the Eocene of China.

== Classification ==
Phylogeny of Nageia

- - - N. fleuryi (Hickel) de Laubenfels
    - - N. motleyi (Parlatore) de Laubenfels
      - N. wallichiana (Presl) Kuntze
  - - N. nagi (Thunberg) Kuntze (Asian bayberry)
    - - N. formosensis (Dümmer) Page
      - N. nankoensis (Hayata) Mill

The genus contains six species:

Image	Scientific name	Distribution
	Nageia fleuryi	S China, E Indochina
	Nageia formosensis	Taiwan
	Nageia maxima	Sarawak
	Nageia motleyi	S Thailand, W Malaysia, Borneo, Sumatra
	Nageia nagi	S China (incl. Hainan), Kyushu in Japan, Taiwan
	Nageia wallichiana	SW India; widespread from Assam + Yunnan to Maluku
