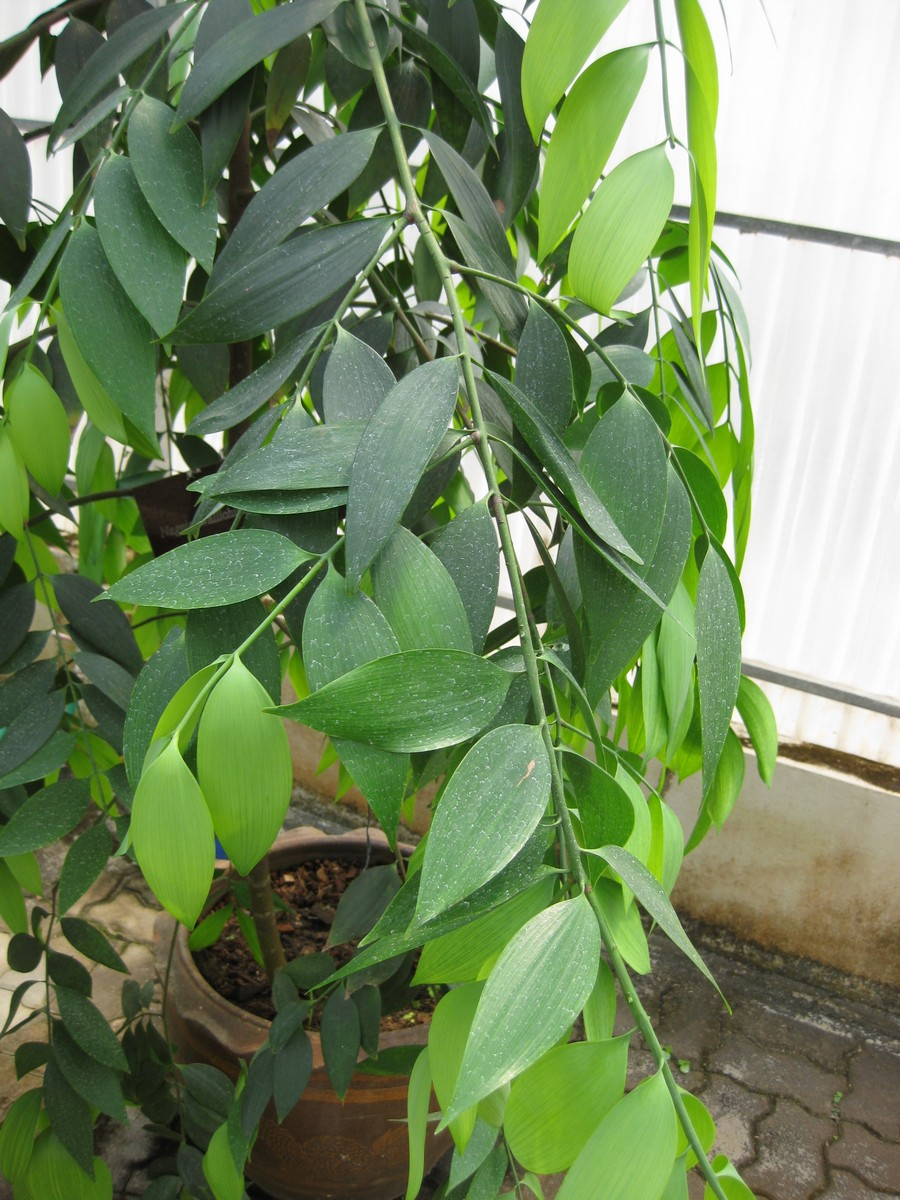

Conservation status
- Least Concern (IUCN 3.1)

Scientific classification
- Kingdom: Plantae
- Clade: Tracheophytes
- Clade: Gymnosperms
- Division: Pinophyta
- Class: Pinopsida
- Order: Araucariales
- Family: Podocarpaceae
- Genus: Nageia
- Species: N. wallichiana

Binomial name
- Nageia wallichiana (C.Presl) Kuntze

Synonyms
- Decussocarpus wallichianus (C.Presl) de Laub.; Nageia blumei (Endl.) Gordon & Glend.; Nageia latifolia Gordon & Glend.; Podocarpus agathifolius Blume; Podocarpus blumei Endl.; Podocarpus latifolius Blume; Podocarpus latifolius Wall.; Podocarpus wallichianus C.Presl

= Nageia wallichiana =

Species of conifer

Nageia wallichiana is a species of conifer in the family Podocarpaceae. It is a tree 10–54 m high, found in Brunei, Cambodia, China, India, Indonesia, Laos, Malaysia, Myanmar, Thailand, and Vietnam. Nageia wallichiana is the most widely distributed species among the seven species in the genus Nageia . If the land areas of China and Japan are excluded, its distribution nearly coincides with that of the genus and includes both the western outliers in India and the easternmost part on Normanby Island. It is one of the most extensive conifer ranges recognized and is similar to Dacrycarpus imbricatus and Podocarpus neriifolius. Nageia wallichiana is the southernmost naturally occurring conifer in the Indian subcontinent.

== Etymology and vernacular names ==
This species was named after an early student of the Indian flora, Nathaniel Wallich. The various synonyms of the species are Podocarpus wallichianus, Decussocarpus wallichianus, Podocarpus latifolius, and Nageia latifolia. Numerous local names have been reported due to its wide distribution. In China, it is called rou tuo zhu bai and in Vietnam, it is known as Kim giao núi đất. In Tamil, it is called as Narambali or Nirambali.

== Description ==
It is an erect evergreen and glabrous tree tall up to 50 m with a cylindrical stem and thin colourless juice. The bark is smooth with a brown and white mottled appearance and 0.5-inch thickness. The bark is hard and scaly with a dark or reddish-brown colour and peeling into thin flakes. The inner bark is pinkish or reddish in colour with 5–6 mm thickness and slightly fibrous. The wood is aromatic, grey coloured, and moderately hard. The anatomy of the wood is described as extremely fine, with numerous rays and faint annual rings. The weight of the wood is recorded as 32 lbs per ft^{3}.

The crown is described as conical or irregularly rounded. Leaves are opposite decussate, subopposite, or rarely alternate towards the end of branchlets. The length of the leaf is recorded as 3-7 inches and width 0.75- 2 inch. The petiole is 5– 10 mm long and twisted 900 at the base. Leaf shape is narrowly elliptic to ovate-lanceolate with acute or obtuse apex. Leaves are coriaceous, tapering at both ends, and have numerous longitudinal nerves. Leaf colour is dark shining green. Stomata seen on both surfaces and is more conspicuous in the underside.

Pollen cones are arranged axillary, on a 4–10 mm long peduncle in clusters of up to 7–10. The pollen cones become cylindrical at its full length and consist of two pollen sacs. Seed cones are axillary, solitary, and arranged in long peduncles, with a few deciduous bracts near the base of the peduncle. The cone bracts fuse to a green swelling and later red or purplish receptacle. The ovoid seeds with 1-inch length are formed at the end of receptacle and enclosed in a green epimatium which later turns into a purple coloured fleshy structure. The fruiting season is January to February.

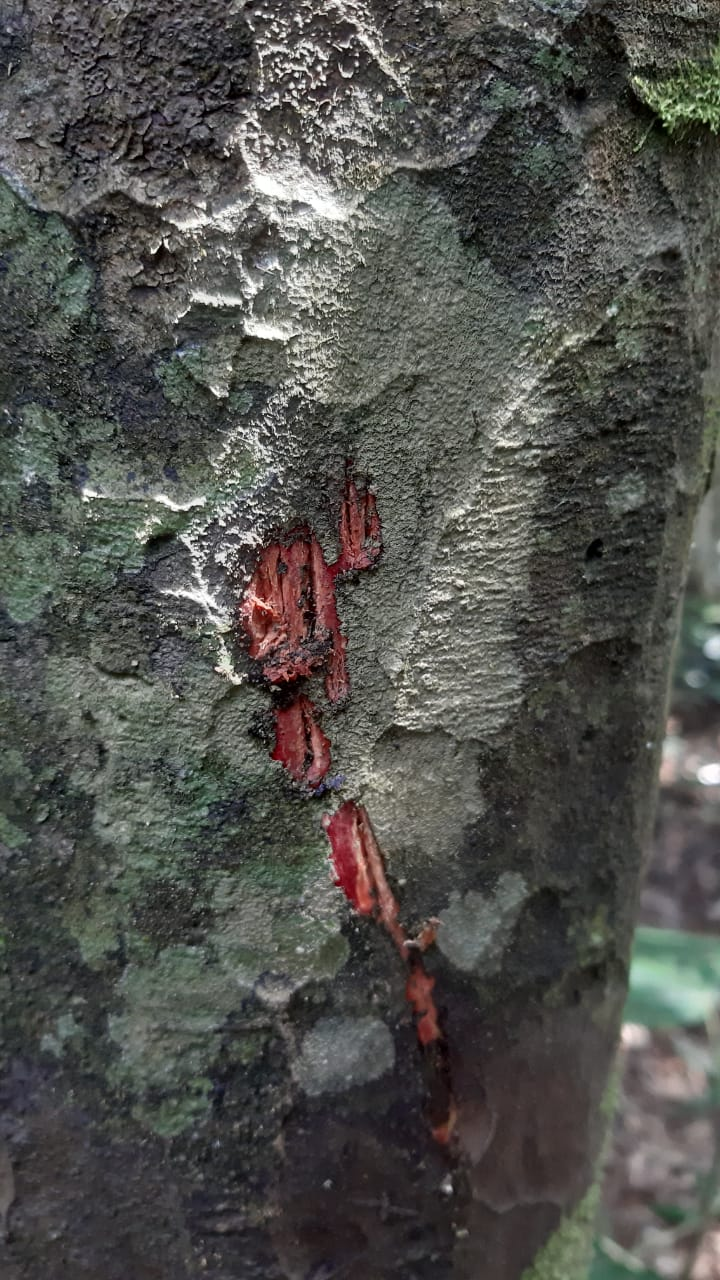
Inner Bark of the tree

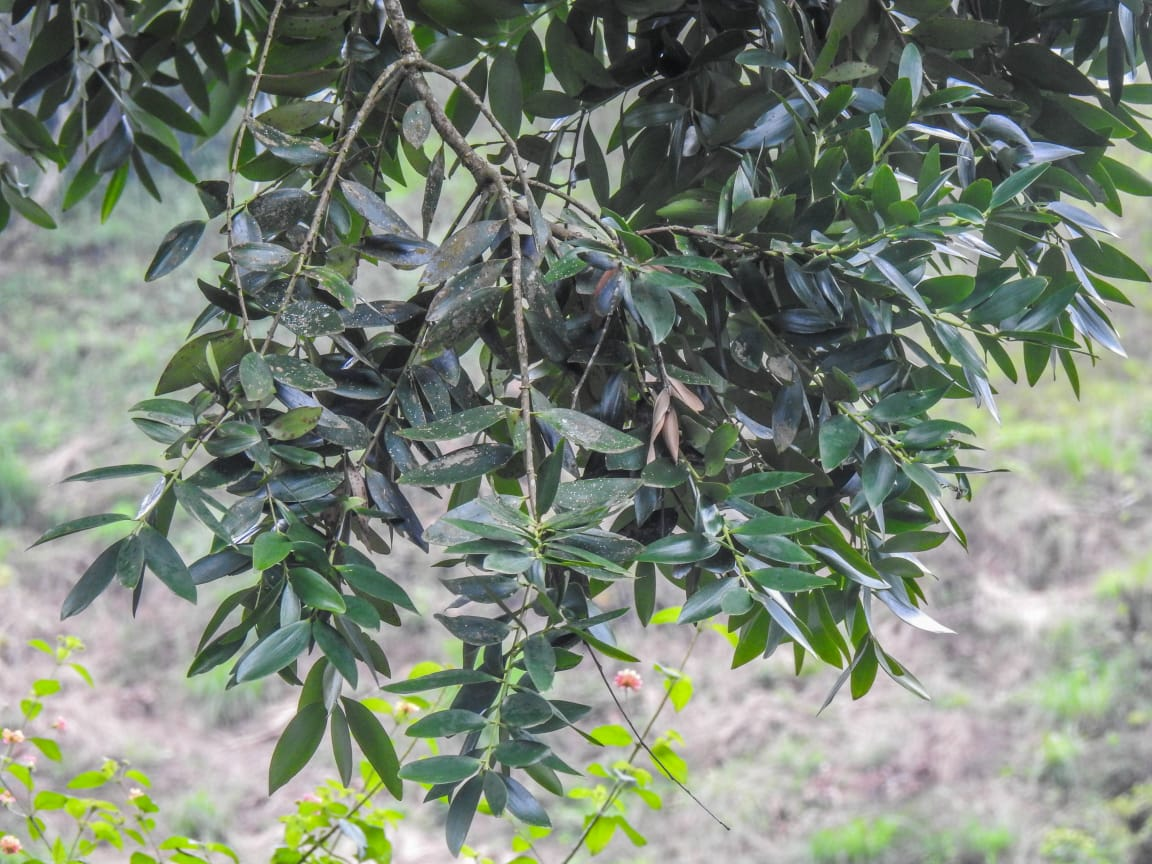
Branchlets

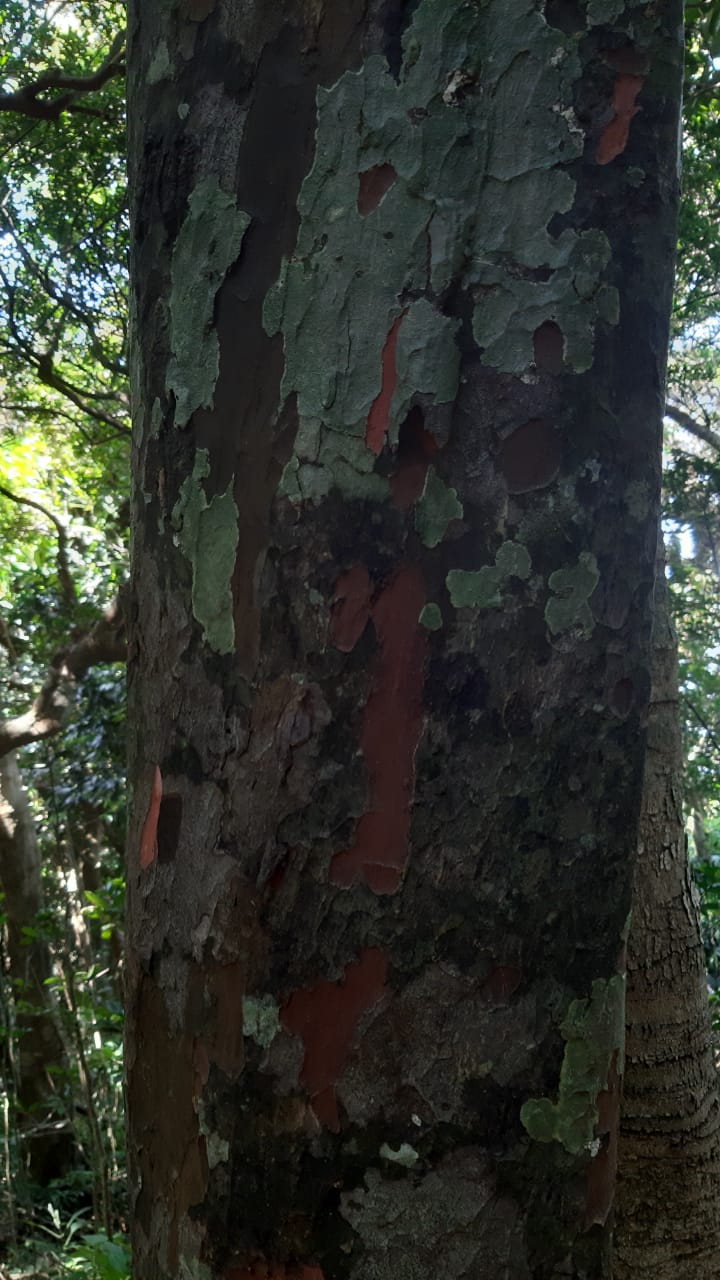
Bark

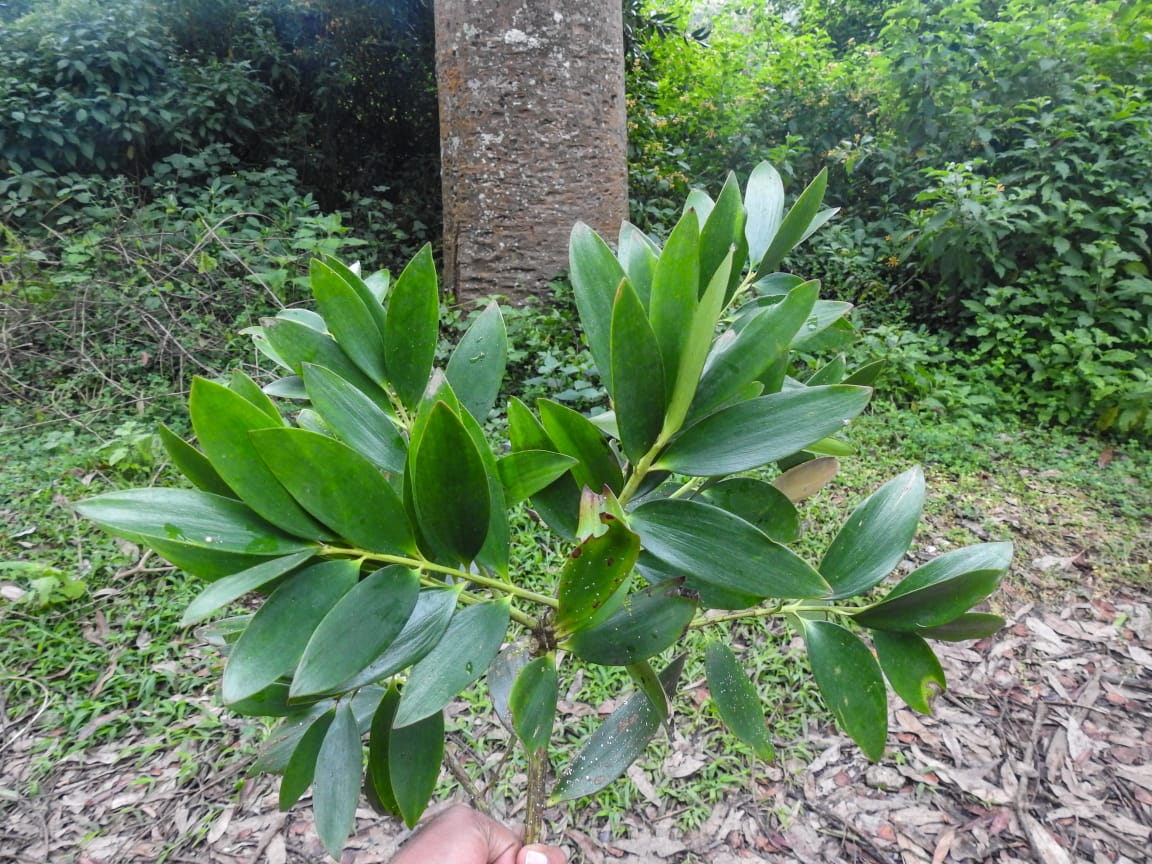
Leaves

== Distribution ==
Nageia wallichiana is the most widely spread member of the genus Nageia, and maybe one of even the most purely tropical of all conifers. It occurs in primary closed evergreen tropical broad-leaved and mixed sub-montane and montane forests. The species is distributed in areas such as Yunnan province of China, Indochina, Malaysia (but not found in Central and Eastern Jawa and on the Lesser Sunda Islands), certain parts of India including Assam, Andaman-Nicobar Islands, and Nilgiri hills and Palani hills of Kerala and Tamil Nadu.

Various floristic inventories in south-East Asia report the occurrence of this species. It has distribution in Cambodia and Laos, Vietnam, South Western China, Malaysia, Raja Ampat Island of Indonesia, North Moluccas, Thailand, and in Kalimantan of Borneo Island.

== Ecology ==
Nageia wallichiana is considered as the most truly tropical of all conifers in the world because of its occurrence from the sea level dipterocarp forests near the equator to montane forests thriving above 2100 m. Usually, the species have a distribution in the altitudinal range from 900 to 1500 m in India while in Vietnam the altitudinal range is specified as 500 m to 2100 m AMSL. The species is seen in closed tropical evergreen broad-leaved forests and mixed submontane and montane forests with mean annual temperature 14-32^{0}C and annual rainfall above 1700 m. The ideal soil types as suggested is granite and silicate derived soils. In the lowland forests, the species is expected to have straight bole lifting its foliage into the top canopy. The species is not considered as a long-lived emergent because of the usually slender boles and absence of buttresses. The bole height may reach 50 m and girth at breast height may be up to 1 m. The growth of the species become stunted in certain conditions like in the edges of the peat swamps, in the mossy forests of the sandstone plateaus of Sarawak, and on the mountain cliffs with sand or clay between the rocks. Nageia wallichiana is found to be more abundant in 'kerangas' (forests on leached sandy soils) than in close canopy rainforests.

It is considered as a species of low ecological amplitude and with a specific ecological niche. This species is considered characteristic of special facies in southern western Ghats which is termed as Nageia wallichiana facies. This is a subtype of Cullenia exarillata – Mesua ferrea – Palaquium ellipticum – Gluta travancorica vegetation type (CMPG). Its distribution is restricted to the east side of the crest of the Western Ghats between 8 ° 20′N and 9 ° 30′N and above 1000 m. elevation.

== Uses ==
Nageia wallichiana is considered as a timber tree with highly valuable wood, particularly where it grows into straight, tall trees with a clear long bole. It is traded as Podocarp wood. Long timber is sawn into planks primarily for house construction. Other wood uses include veneer, plywood, furniture making, interior finishing, and often the construction of small canoes in areas like Fly River, Wagu, and Papua New Guinea. Short stems are utilized for making household utensils. The wood is highly appreciated for musical instruments, fine crafts, chopsticks, and household instruments. The leaves are used for cough as a conventional remedy in Vietnam, and the tree is considered as highly ornamental. The decoction of leaves is taken orally for curing joint pains by Nicobarese.

== Threats ==
According to the IUCN conservation strategy, Nageia wallichiana is a Least Concern (LC) species because of its widespread nature. Its population shows a decreasing trend in the case of mature individuals. The total population size of this species is not known and it is likely to have declined due to large scale habitat loss. The population is found to be severely fragmented. The global threats include the cultivation of annual and perennial non-timber crops and wood and pulp plantations in the natural habitats. Logging and wood harvesting are also endangering the survival of this species. Globally there are no action recovery plans or systematic monitoring schemes for this species.
