= Kumano Hayatama Taisha =

Shinto shrine in Wakayama Prefecture, Japan

Kumano Hayatama Taisha (熊野速玉大社)
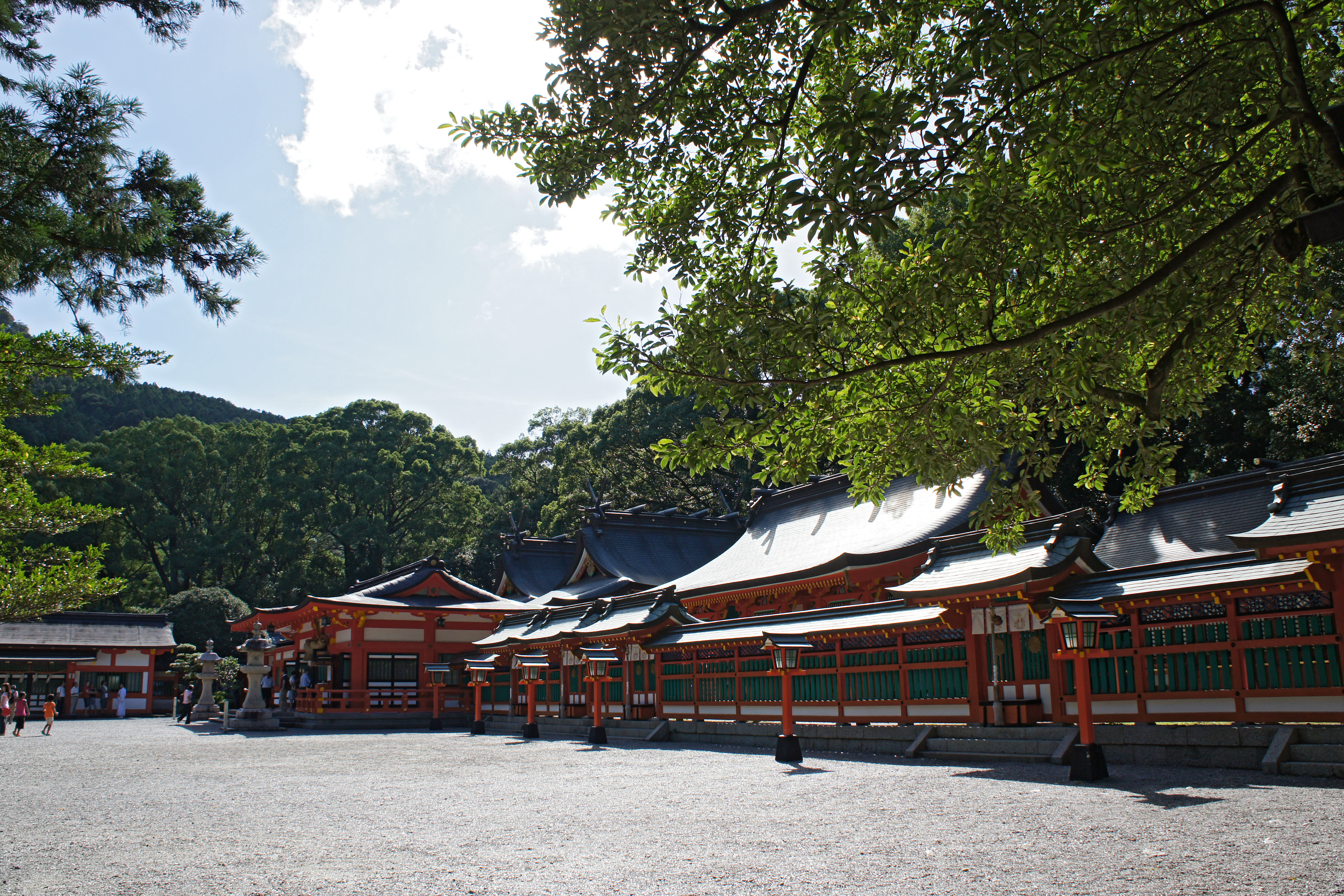
- A view of Kumano Hayatama Taisha

- Location within Japan

Religion
- Affiliation: Shinto

Location
- Location: Shingu, Wakayama Prefecture
- Coordinates: 33°43′55.03″N 135°59′1.41″E

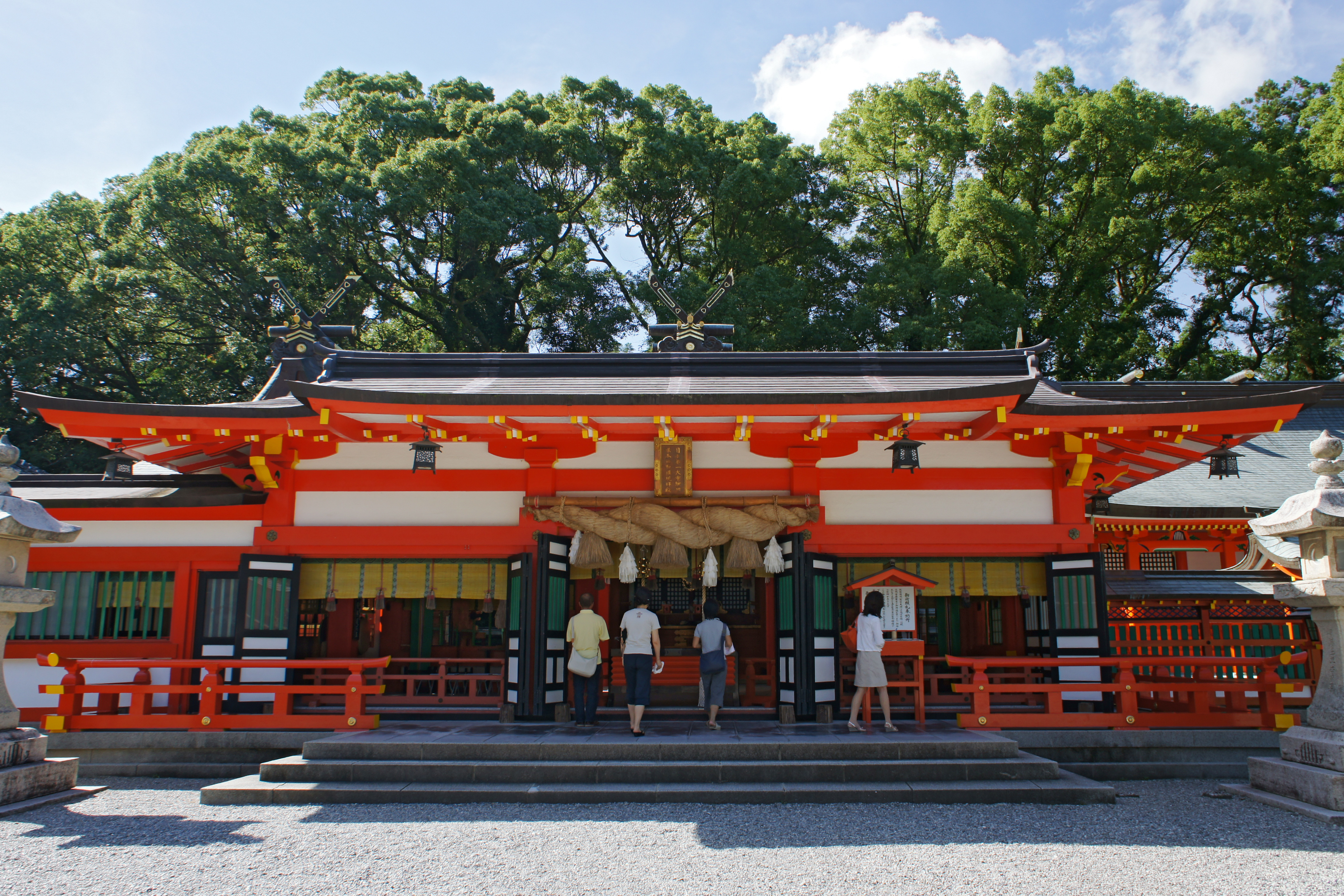
Haiden

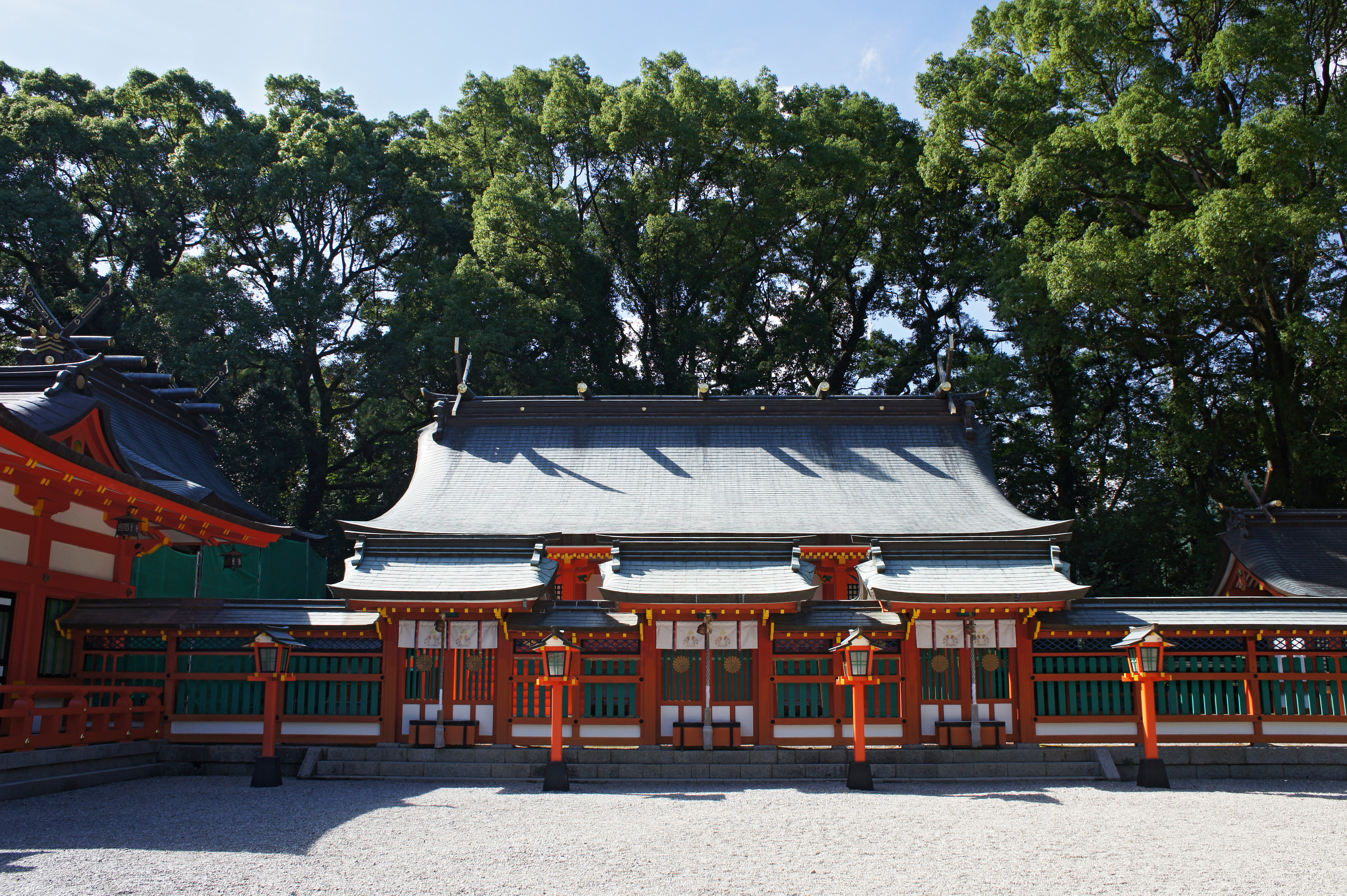
Suzumon

Kumano Hayatama Taisha (熊野速玉大社) is a Shinto shrine located in Shingu, Wakayama Prefecture, on the shores of the Kumanogawa in the Kii Peninsula of Japan. It is included as part of the Kumano Sanzan in the UNESCO World Heritage site "Sacred Sites and Pilgrimage Routes in the Kii Mountain Range". The three Kumano Sanzan shrines are the Sōhonsha ("head shrines") of all Kumano shrines, lie at between 20 and 40 km of distance one from the other and are connected by the pilgrimage route known as "Kumano Sankeimichi" (熊野参詣道).

== See also ==
- List of National Treasures of Japan (crafts-others)
- List of National Treasures of Japan (sculptures)
- Sacred Nagi Tree of Kumano Hayatama Taisha
