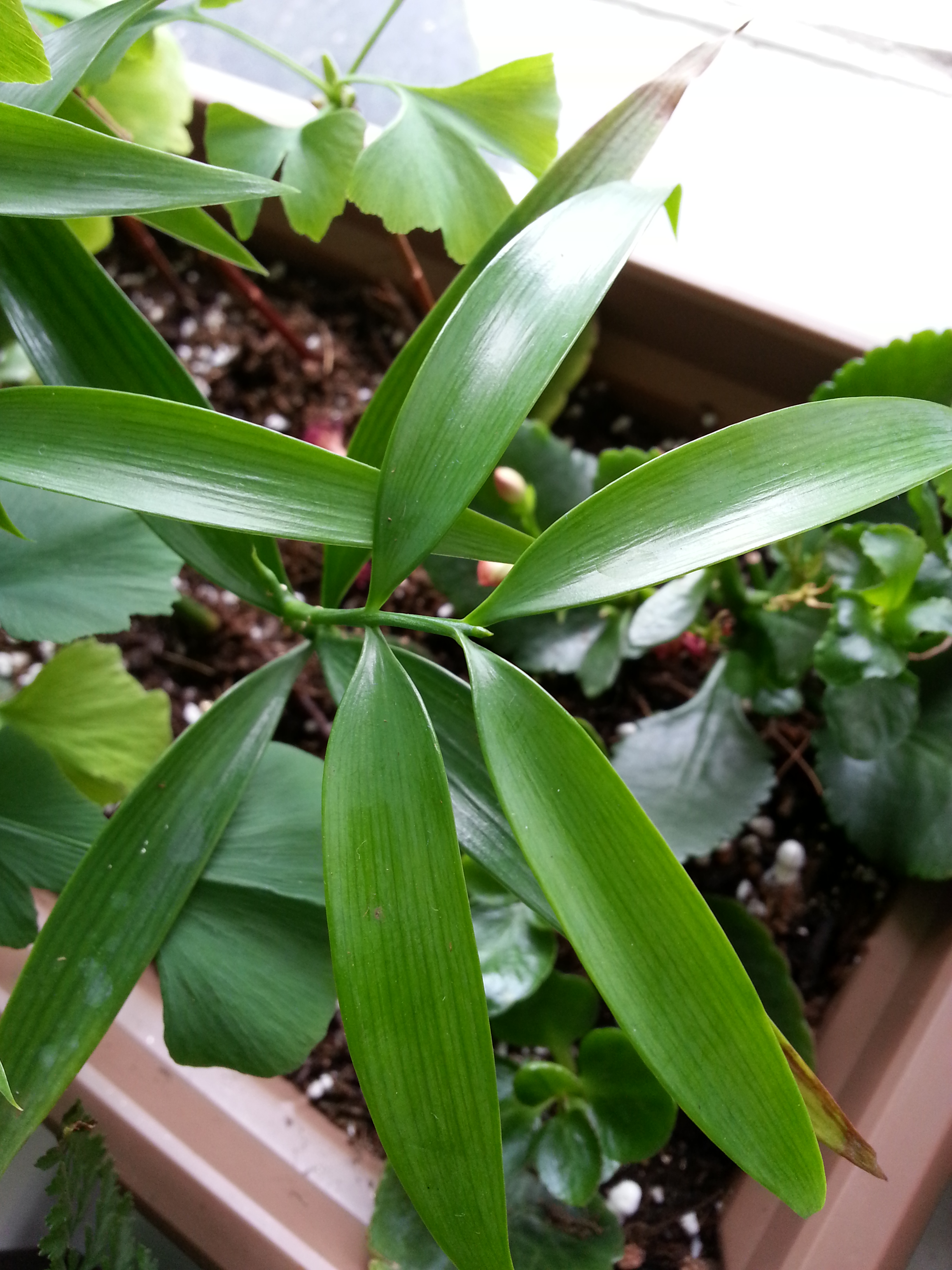

Conservation status
- Near Threatened (IUCN 3.1)

Scientific classification
- Kingdom: Plantae
- Clade: Tracheophytes
- Clade: Gymnosperms
- Division: Pinophyta
- Class: Pinopsida
- Order: Araucariales
- Family: Podocarpaceae
- Genus: Nageia
- Species: N. fleuryi

Binomial name
- Nageia fleuryi (Hickel) de Laub.

Synonyms
- Decussocarpus fleuryi (Hickel) de Laub.; Podocarpus fleuryi Hickel; Podocarpus fleuryi var. parvifolia Gaussen

= Nageia fleuryi =

Species of conifer

Nageia fleuryi is a species of conifer in the family Podocarpaceae. It is a tree up to 30 metres (98 ft) tall, with pyramidal crown, found in Cambodia, China (Guangdong, Guangxi, and Yunnan provinces), Laos, Taiwan, and Vietnam. Its wood is highly valued and used for musical instruments, chop sticks, fine crafts and household tools.
