= Nageia formosensis =

Conservation status
- Data Deficient (IUCN 2.3)

Scientific classification
- Kingdom: Plantae
- Clade: Embryophytes
- Clade: Tracheophytes
- Clade: Gymnosperms
- Division: Pinophyta
- Class: Pinopsida
- Order: Araucariales
- Family: Podocarpaceae
- Genus: Nageia
- Species: N. formosensis

Binomial name
- Nageia formosensis Dummer C.N.Page

Species of conifer

Nageia formosensis is a species of conifer in the family Podocarpaceae. It is endemic to Taiwan.
