= Sacred Nagi Tree of Kumano Hayatama Taisha =

Natural Monument of Japan

Coordinates: 33°43′54″N 135°59′02″E

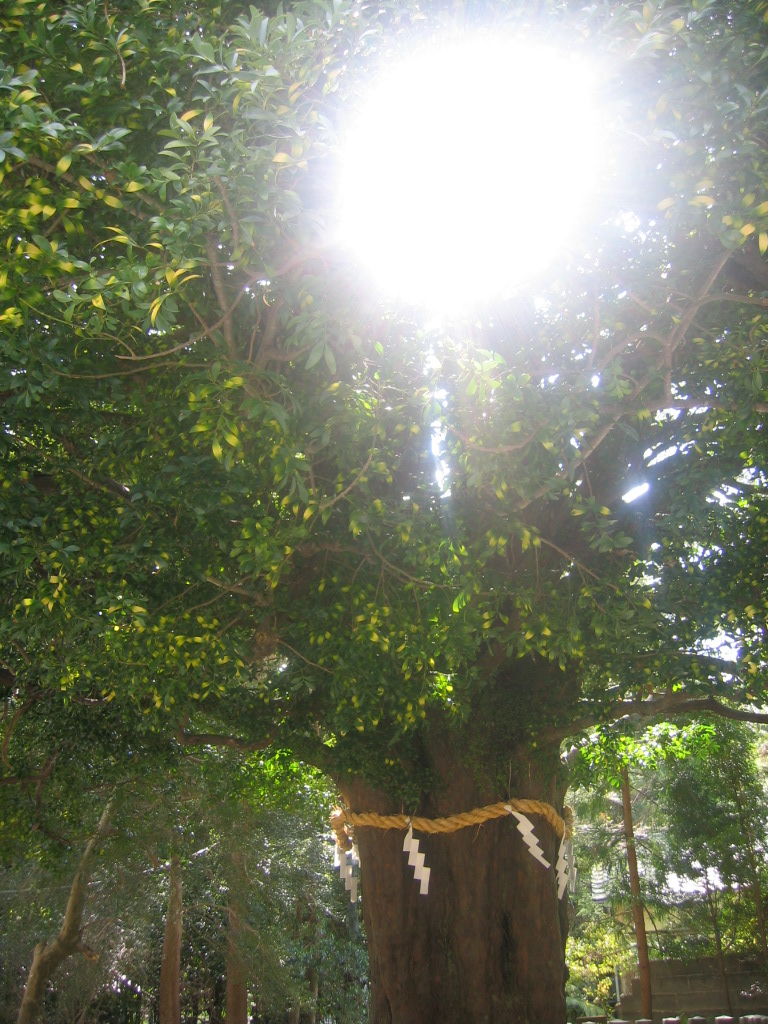
Nagi tree in Shingu city

The Sacred Nagi Tree of Kumano Hayatama Taisha is one of the Natural Monuments of Japan and is situated in Kumano Hayatama Taisha in Shingu city, Wakayama, Japan. Kumano Hayatama Taisha is one of three Kumano Sanzan shrine/temple sites, and is part of the UNESCO World Heritage Site "Sacred Sites and Pilgrimage Routes in the Kii Mountain Range". The nagi tree, Nageia nagi, is also called the broadleaf podocarpus.

It is said that this tree, which has grown to a height of 17.6 m and a circumference of 5.45 m, was planted as a memorial by Taira no Shigemori in Heiji 1 (1159).

== See also ==
- List of individual trees
