= Nageia maxima =

Conservation status
- Endangered (IUCN 3.1)

Scientific classification
- Kingdom: Plantae
- Clade: Tracheophytes
- Clade: Gymnosperms
- Division: Pinophyta
- Class: Pinopsida
- Order: Araucariales
- Family: Podocarpaceae
- Genus: Nageia
- Species: N. maxima

Binomial name
- Nageia maxima (de Laub.) de Laub.

Synonyms
- Decussocarpus maximus de Laub. Podocarpus maxima (de Laub.) Gaussen

Species of conifer

Nageia maxima is a species of conifer in the family Podocarpaceae. It is found only in Borneo, where it is confined to Sarawak. It is threatened by habitat loss.
