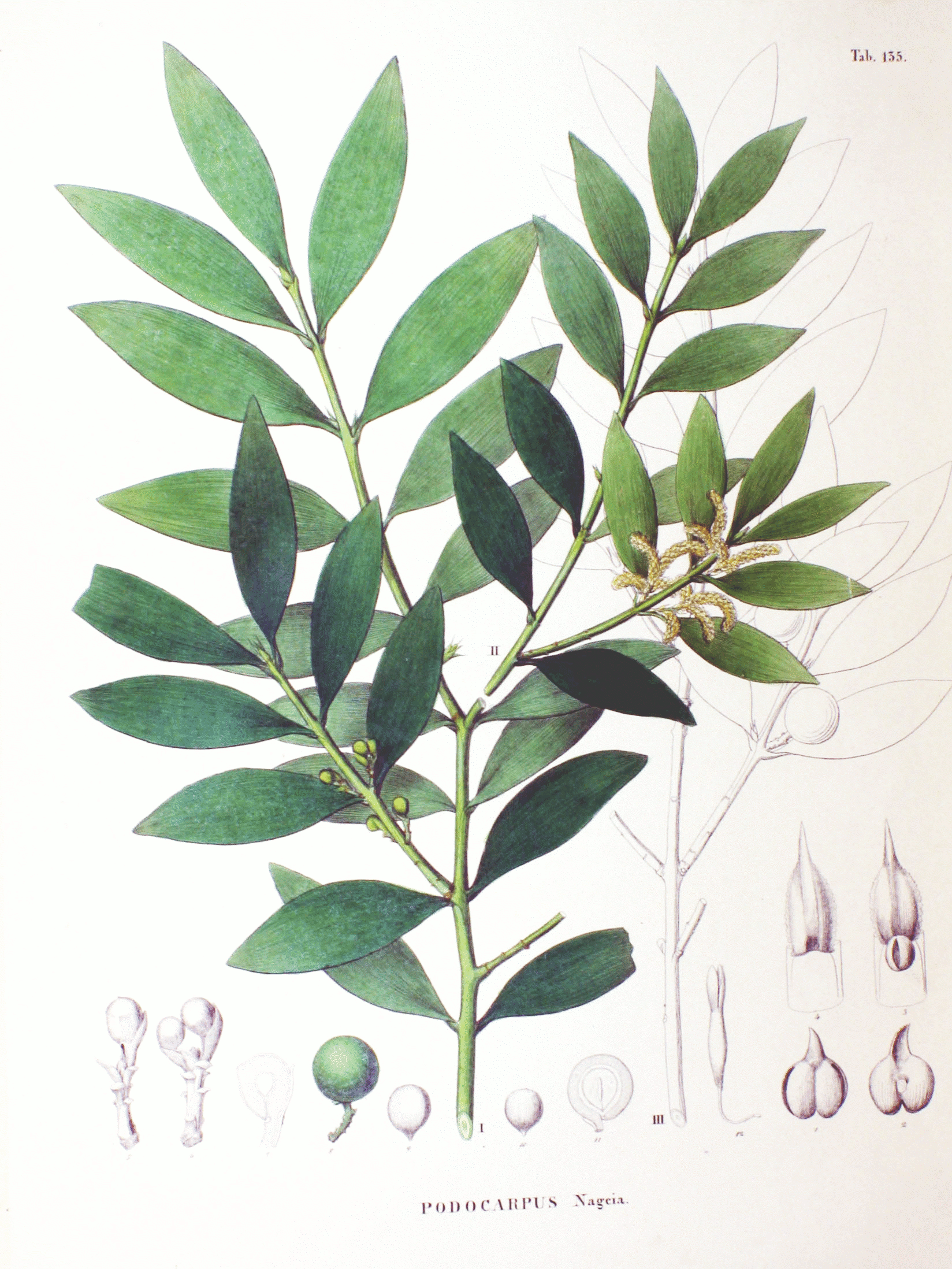

Conservation status
- Near Threatened (IUCN 3.1)

Scientific classification
- Kingdom: Plantae
- Clade: Embryophytes
- Clade: Tracheophytes
- Clade: Gymnosperms
- Division: Pinophyta
- Class: Pinopsida
- Order: Araucariales
- Family: Podocarpaceae
- Genus: Nageia
- Species: N. nagi

Binomial name
- Nageia nagi (Thunb.) Kuntze

Synonyms
- Agathis veitchii (Henkel & Hochst.) Seward & Ford; Dammara veitchii Henkel & Hochst.; Myrica nagi Thunb.

= Nageia nagi =

Species of plant

Nageia nagi, or the Asian bayberry, is a species of conifer in the family Podocarpaceae. Nageia nagi is native to China, Japan, and Taiwan.

== Description ==
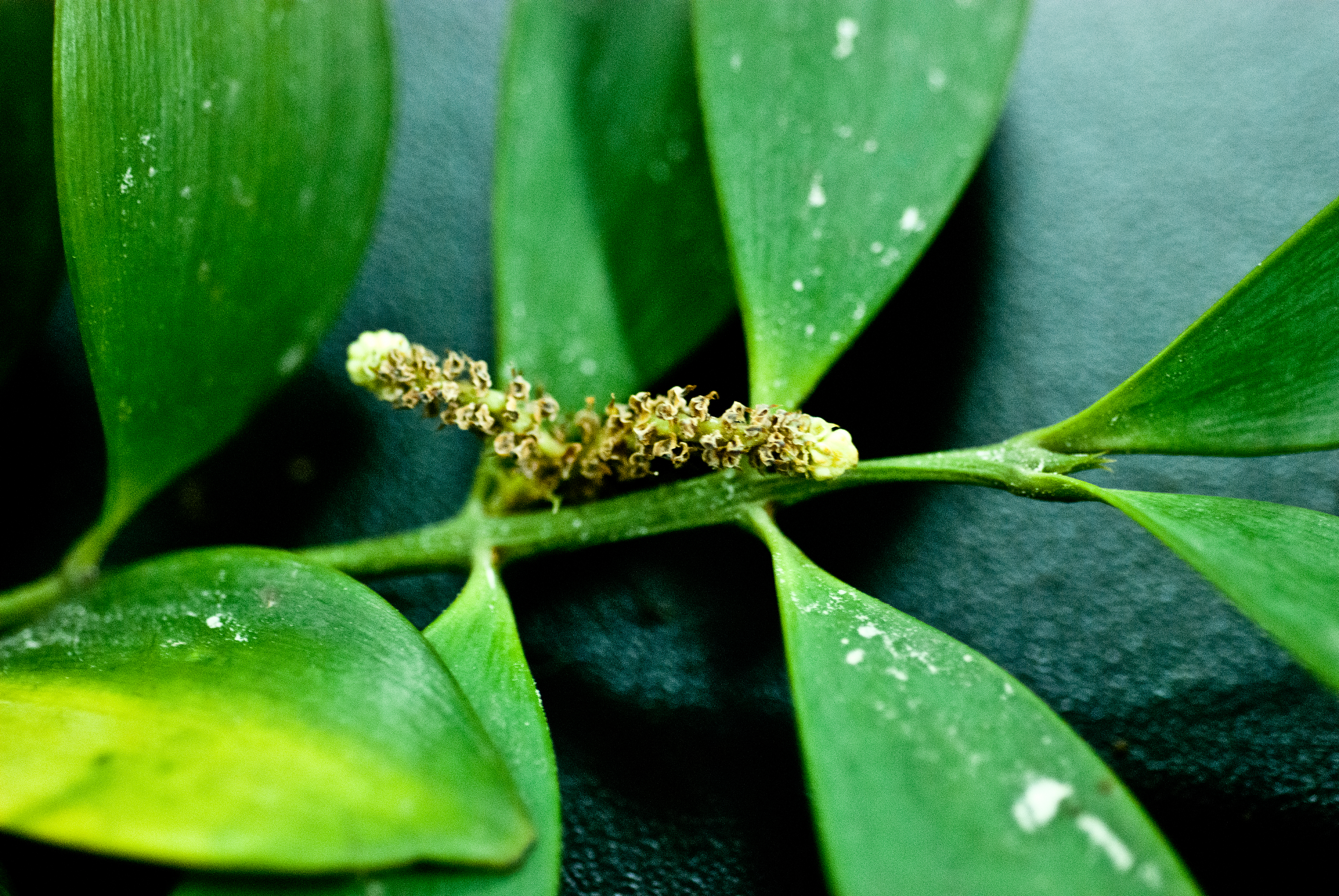
Nageia nagi pollen cones

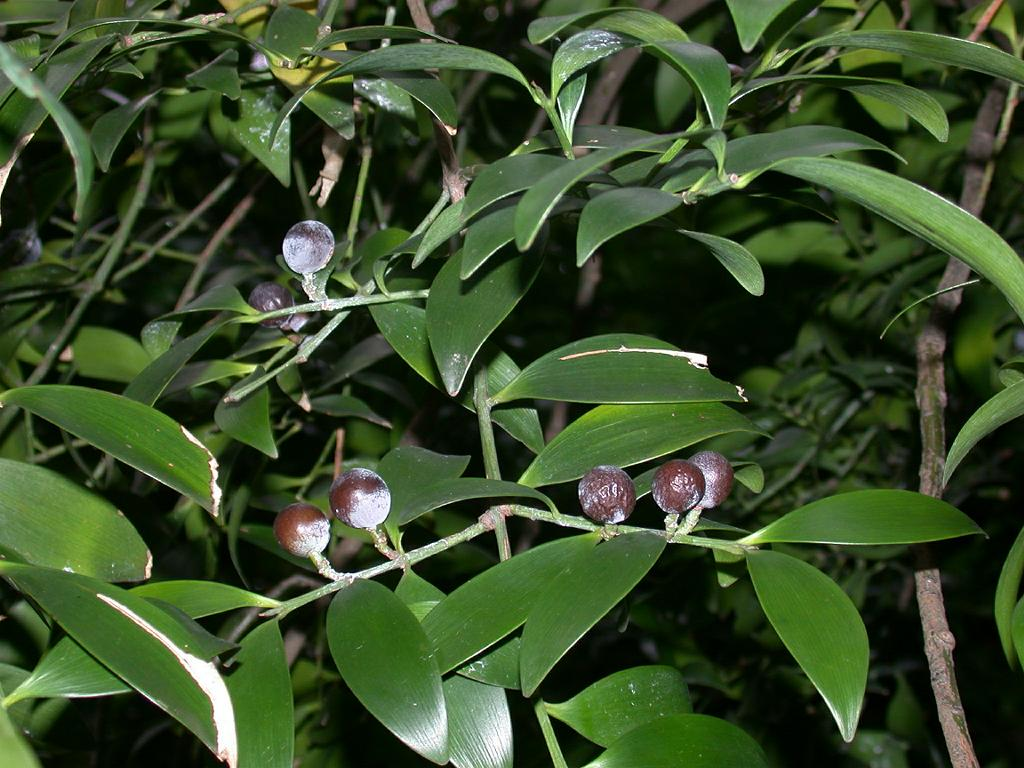
Nageia nagi seed cones

Nageia nagi is a hardy tree species that can withstand a range of weather conditions, but it prefers moist sites that are well drained and with full sunlight to light shade. Being from the family Podocarpaceae, it is a dioecious tree, that is, the male and female parts of the trees are on separate plants. The pollen cones are similar to catkins and the female cones, which mature in one year, are reduced fleshy bracts that contain a single inverted ovule. It requires wind for pollination; it cannot self-pollinate.

The trees range from fifteen to twenty meters in height and are relatively slow growing. The leaves are lanceolate in shape, and are arranged sub opposite on the branches. Leaves range from two to eight inches long and 0.75 to 2.5 inches wide and lack a mid-vein. The new leaves are a light green and as they age they become dark green and glossy. The branches also start out as green but as they age they become reddish brown and peel in small layers.

Nageia nagi can be propagated by cuttings or by seed. It is best to plant the seed in a warm greenhouse and sandy soil. For their permanent position, they should be planted in late spring or early summer after the last frost.

The species is threatened by habitat loss.

== Uses ==
Houses, bridges, utensils, handiwork and furniture are constructed from the wood. The seeds yield an oil that is edible and valued in industry. Young leaves are sometimes cooked and eaten. Its bark exhibits strong antibacterial effect. Stems are used in floral arrangements that last in water for up to a year.

== See also ==
- Sacred Nagi Tree of Kumano Hayatama Taisha
