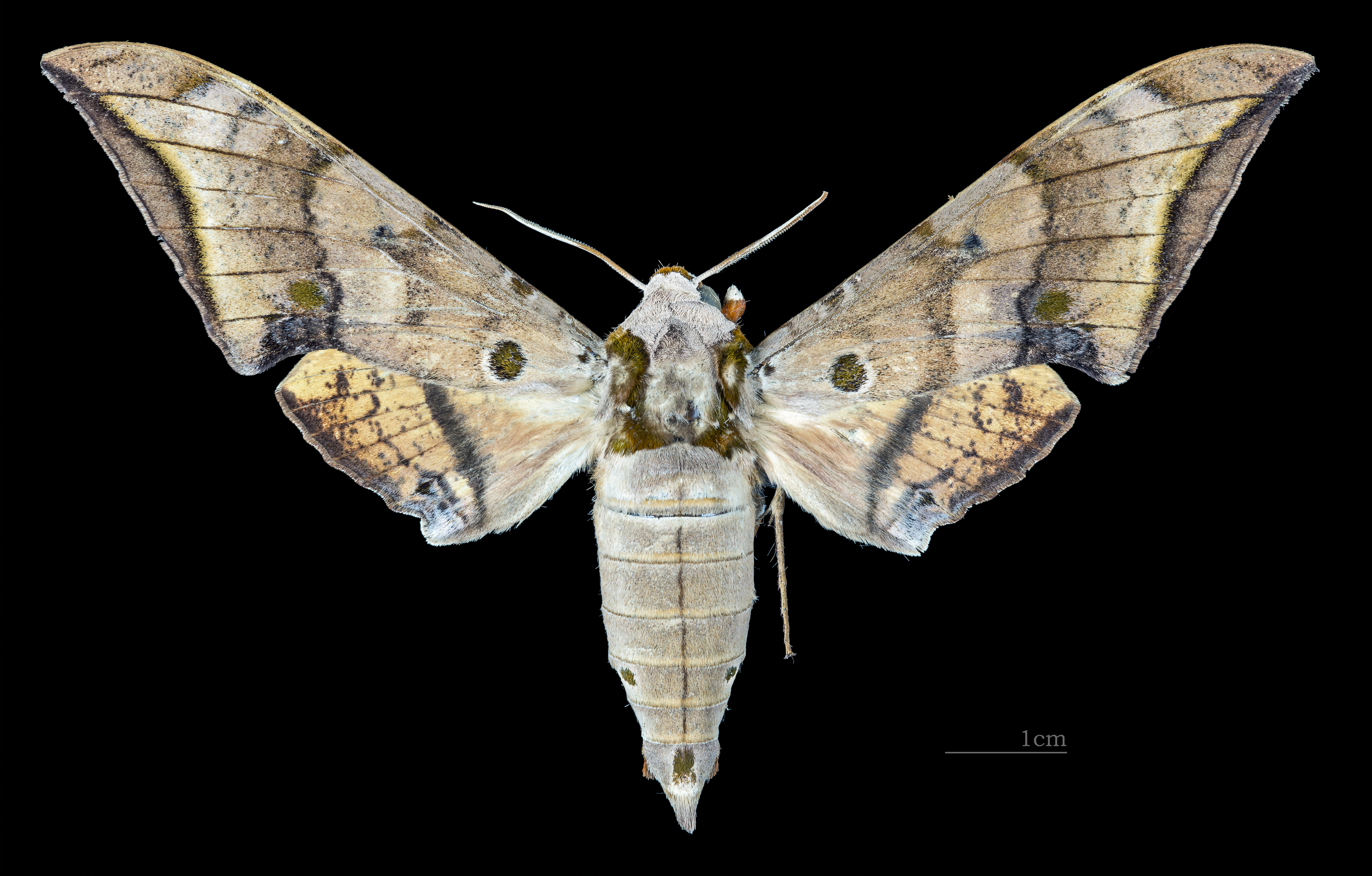
- Male dorsal
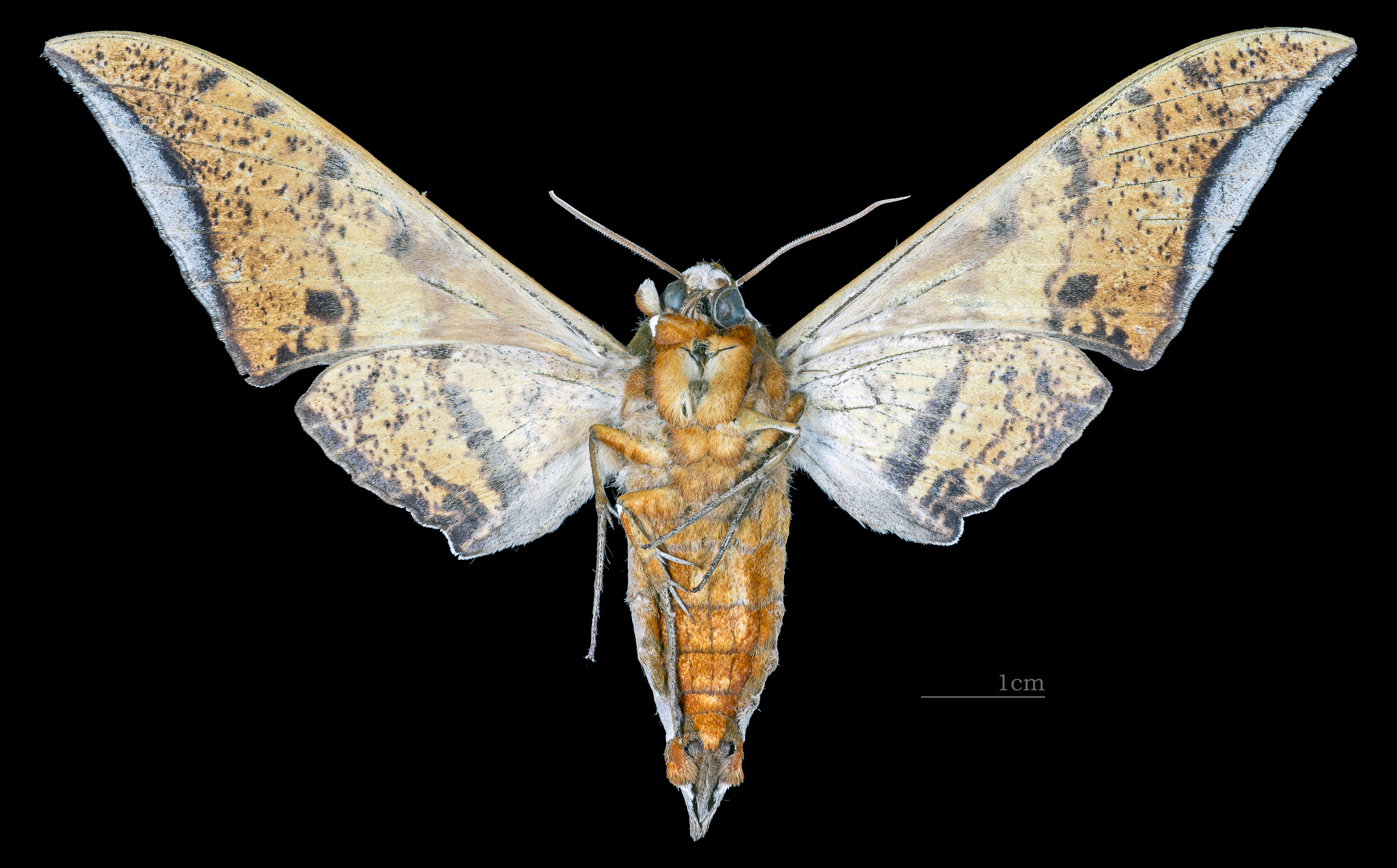
- Male ventral

Scientific classification
- Kingdom: Animalia
- Phylum: Arthropoda
- Class: Insecta
- Order: Lepidoptera
- Family: Sphingidae
- Genus: Ambulyx
- Species: A. maculifera

Binomial name
- Ambulyx maculifera Walker, 1866

Synonyms
- Ambulyx consanguis Butler, 1881

= Ambulyx maculifera =

Species of moth

Ambulyx maculifera is a species of moth of the family Sphingidae. It is known from India.
