= Yellowwood =

Yellowwood may refer to:

== Plants ==
- Afrocarpus spp., a genus of conifers native to Africa, Afrocarpus falcatus (Syn.: Podocarpus falcatus), common, smooth-barked, bastard, small-leaved yellowwood, Afrocarpus gracilior (Syn.: Podocarpus gracilior), East African yellowwood, Outeniqua yellowwood
- Annickia spp., African yellowwood
- Alstonia spectabilis, milky yellowwood
- Berberis vulgaris
- Cassine crocea, yellowwood, saffron wood
- Cladrastis spp., a genus of trees in the family Fabaceae
- Cladrastis kentukea spp., a tree indigenous to the south eastern United States, American, Kentucky yellowwood
- Cladrastis delavayi (Syn.: Cladrastis sinensis), Chinese yellowwood
- Coprosma linariifolia, a shrub or small tree of New Zealand
- Cornus sericea (Syn.: Cornus stolonifera)
- Cotinus coggygri (Syn.: Rhus cotinus)
- Euxylophora paraensis, Brazilian yellowwood, yellowheart
- Flindersia xanthoxyla, a tall rainforest tree from Australia in the family Rutaceae
- Frangula alnus, Frangula caroliniana
- Maackia amurensis, Chinese yellowwood
- Maclura pomifera, a fruit in the family Moraceae
- Ochrosia, a genus in the family Apocynacaeae native to southeastern Asia, Australia, and the Pacific
- Podocarpus spp., a genus of conifers of the family Podocarpaceae, Breede River yellowwood, Podocarpus henkelii, Henkel's, Falcate, Drankensberg, Natal, long-leaved, (East) Griqualand yellowwood, Podocarpus guatemalensis, British Honduras yellowwood, Podocarpus latifolius, real, true, broad-leaved, upright yellowwood
- Rhodosphaera spp., Rhodosphaera rhodanthema, deep yellowwood
- Rhus coriaria
- Sarcomelicope simplicifolia (big yellowwood), a small rainforest tree from Australia in the family Rutaceae
- Zanthoxylum spp., Zanthoxylum americanum, a shrub of North America, little yellowwood Zanthoxylum ovalifolium and for thorny yellowwood, Zanthoxylum pinnatum, Zanthoxylum brachyacanthum or Zanthoxylum piperitum etc.

== Other ==
- Yellowwood Park
- Yellowwood State Forest, a state forest in Brown County, Indiana
