= Victoria Basin forest–savanna mosaic =

Ecoregion in Africa

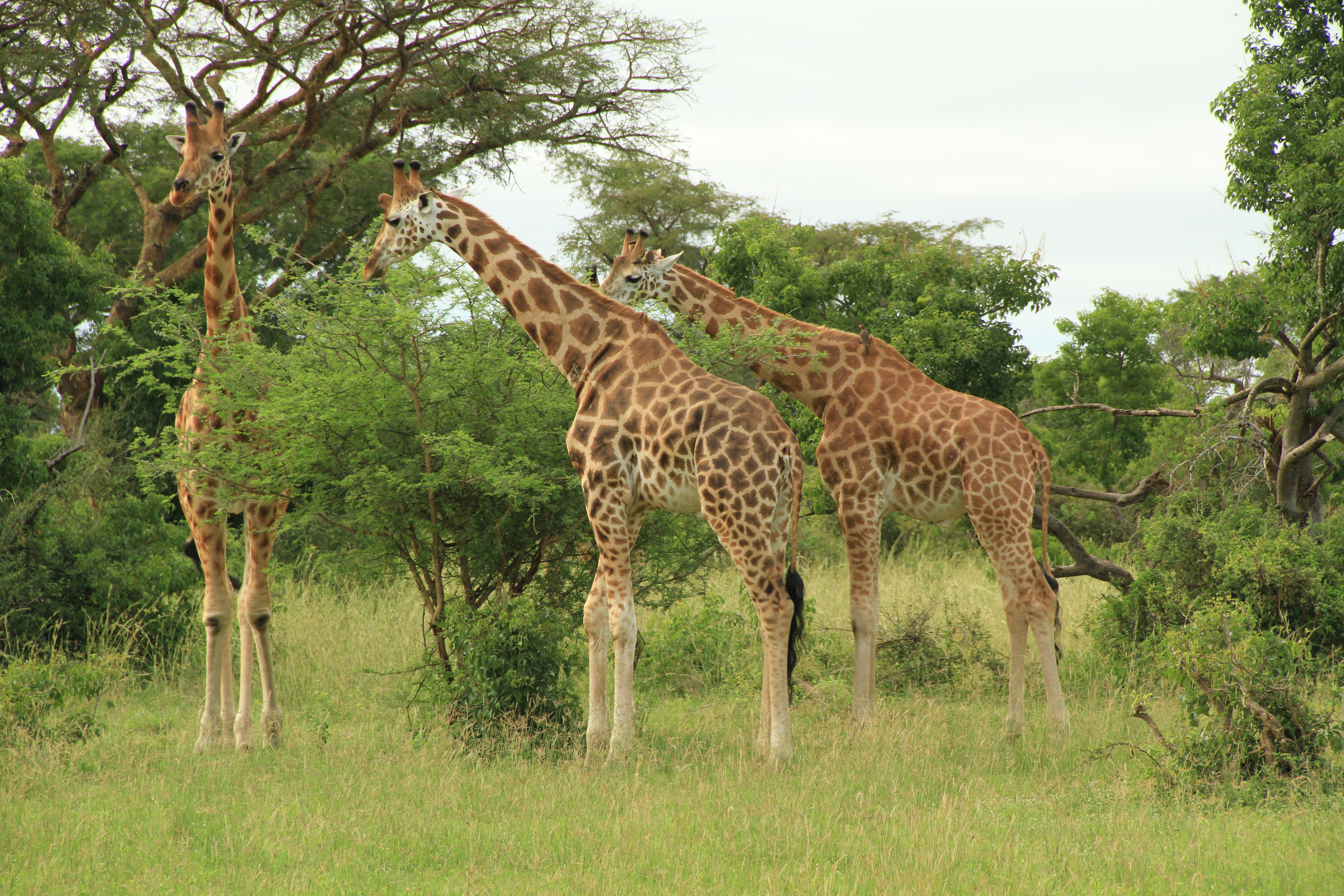
- Giraffes in Murchison Falls National Park, Uganda

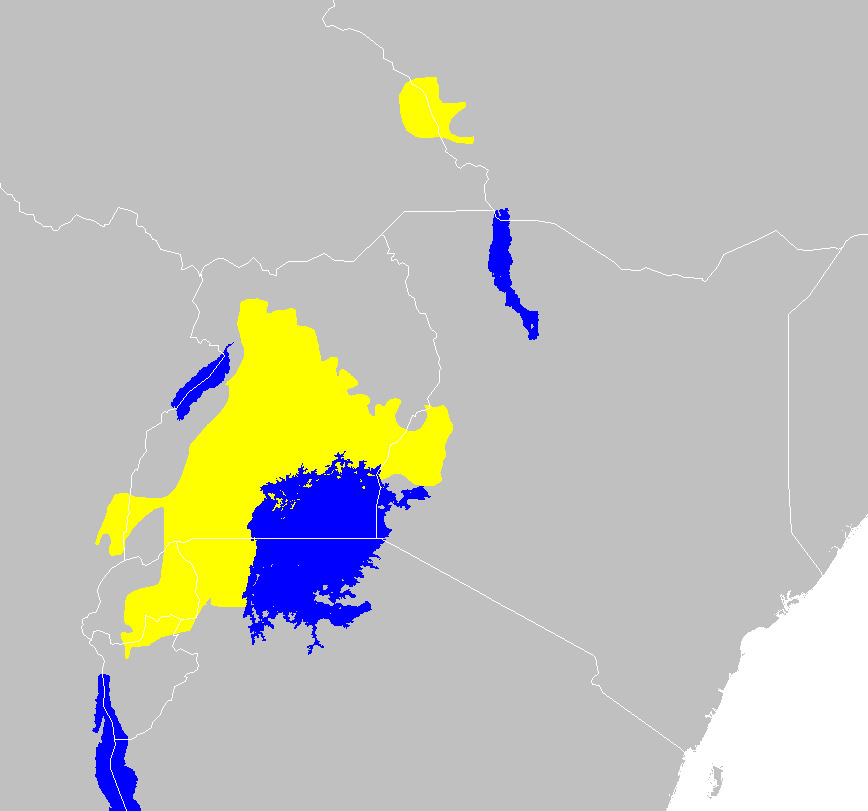
- Map of the Victoria Basin forest–savanna mosaic

Ecology
- Realm: Afrotropical
- Biome: Tropical and subtropical grasslands, savannas, and shrublands

Geography
- Area: 165,800 km^{2} (64,000 mi^{2})
- Countries: Burundi, Democratic Republic of the Congo, Ethiopia, Kenya, Rwanda, South Sudan, Tanzania, Uganda

Conservation
- Conservation status: critical
- Protected: 14%

The Victoria Basin forest–grassland mosaic is an ecoregion that lies mostly in Uganda and extends into neighboring countries. The ecoregion is centered north and west of Lake Victoria, with an outlier on the border of Ethiopia and South Sudan.

== Geography ==
The ecoregion covers an area of 165,800 km^{2} (64,000 sq mi). It lies in the upper basin of the Nile River, between 800 and 1500 meters elevation. It is bounded on the west by the higher-elevation Afromontane forests of the Albertine Rift, which separate it from the Congolian rainforests of the Congo Basin. It is bounded on the east by the highlands of Kenya's Eastern Rift, which are home to the Afromontane Eastern Arc forests. To the north, the forest-savanna mosaic transitions to the drier East Sudanian savanna. On the southwest, it transitions to the Central Zambezian miombo woodlands.

The ecoregion's smaller northern outlier lies on the border of Ethiopia and South Sudan. It is bounded on the east by the Ethiopian Highlands, on the west by the East Sudanian savanna, and on the south by the Northern Acacia–Commiphora bushlands and thickets.

== Climate ==
The ecoregion's climate is tropical. Annual maximum mean temperatures range from 24º to 27º, and mean minimum temperatures range from 15 °C to 18 °C. Rainfall generally ranges from 1000 to 1400 mm annually, but exceeds 2000 mm on the Ssese Islands in Lake Victoria, and in the northern enclave on the South Sudan-Ethiopia border, and is only 700 mm around Lake Edward in the Western Rift. Most rain falls in the two rainy seasons, from March to May and from August to November.

== Flora and fauna ==
The predominant vegetation includes extensive areas of savanna and woodland, interspersed with smaller areas of forest. Papyrus swamps are common in river lowlands.

=== Plant communities ===
The principal plant communities include Lake Victoria drier peripheral semi-evergreen Guineo-Congolian rain forest, Lake Victoria transitional rain forest, moist Combretum wooded grassland, dry Combretum wooded grassland, Evergreen and semi-evergreen bushland and thicket, Edaphic wooded grassland on drainage-impeded or seasonally flooded soils, and swamp forest.

=== Semi-evergreen rainforest ===
Semi-evergreen rainforest was the predominant vegetation type on the north shore of Lake Victoria and southeast of Lake Albert. Botanist Frank White designated it as "Lake Victoria drier peripheral semi-evergreen Guineo-Congolian rain forest", a floristically impoverished variant of the species-rich Guineo-Congolian forests found further to the east in the Congo Basin.

Characteristic trees include large-leaved albizia (Albizia grandibracteata), cheesewood (Alstonia boonei), false mvule (Antiaris toxicaria), African ita (Celtis adolfi-friderici), white stinkwood (Celtis africana), bastard white stinkwood (Celtis gomphophylla), red-fruited white stinkwood (Celtis mildbraedii), Celtis philippensis, Celtis zenkeri, white star apple (Gambeya albida), Uganda ironwood (Cynometra alexandri), Budongo mahogany (Entandrophragma angolense), Sapelli mahogany (Entandrophragma cylindricum), Budongo heavy mahogany (Entandrophragma utile), orange-barked terminalia (Holoptelea grandis), smooth-barked mahogany (Khaya anthotheca), big-leaf mahogany (Khaya grandifoliola), umbrella tree (Maesopsis eminii), Mildbraediodendron excelsum, mvule (Milicia excelsa), Uganda mulberry (Morus mesozygia), African greenheart (Piptadeniastrum africanum), aningeria (Aningeria altissima), and African nutmeg (Pycnanthus angolensis).

This vegetation type covers an area of 48,223 km^{2}, of which 4.6% is in protected areas explicitly designated for biodiversity, species or landscape protection (IUCN protected area categories I - IV), and another 4.9% is in areas designated for both protection and sustainable use (IUCN categories V - VI). Human activity has transformed most of the original rainforest area to various types of savanna, or to agriculture and tree plantations. Mabira Forest is the largest remaining block of semi-evergreen forest. The reserve is secondary forest, and has been subject to long-term human influence, including logging since the early 20th century and encroachment by banana and coffee plantations in the 1970s and 80s.

=== Lake Victoria transitional rain forest ===
Transitional rainforests are evergreen rain forests found at the eastern and western ends of the ecoregion. They are transitional between lowland forests which are mostly made up of Guineo-Congolian species, and higher-elevation Afromontane forests, and the transitional forests include both characteristic lowland and highland species. The Kakamega and South Nandi forests in western Kenya occur 1520 to 1680 meters elevation, west of the highlands that bound the Eastern Rift.

Characteristic trees of the Kakamega and South Nandi forests include alangium (Alangium chinense), peacock flower (Albizia gummifera), pear wood (Apodytes dimidiata), bastard white stinkwood (Celtis gomphophylla), Gambeya gorungosana, drum tree (Cordia millenii), Ehretia cymosa, Budongo mahogany (Entandrophragma angolense), orange-milk tree (Harungana madagascariensis), river macaranga (Macaranga capensis), umbrella tree (Maesopsis eminii), calabash nutmeg (Monodora myristica), Neoboutonia macrocalyx, East African newtonia (Newtonia buchananii), aningeria (Pouteria altissima), red stinkwood (Prunus africana), jumping seed tree (Shirakiopsis elliptica), Strombosia scheffleri, Guinea waterberry (Syzygium guineense), Turraea holstii, and lemonwood (Xymalos monospora).

=== Swamp forest ===
A distinctive swamp forest community is found along the lower reaches of the Kagera River west of Lake Victoria, on the border of Tanzania and Uganda. The Tanzanian portion is known as the Minziro Forest, and the Ugandan portion as the Sango Bay forests. Baikieaea insignis subsp. minor and Afrocarpus dawei are the dominant canopy trees.

== Protected areas ==
14% of the ecoregion is in protected areas, including national parks and forest reserves. Uganda's Queen Elizabeth National Park and the Democratic Republic of the Congo's Virunga National Park lie in the basin of Lake Edward, in the western portion of the ecoregion. Other protected areas include Murchison Falls National Park, Lake Mburo National Park, and Mabira Forest Reserve in Uganda, Akagera National Park in Rwanda, Minziro Forest Nature Reserve in Tanzania, and Kakamega Forest Reserve in Kenya.
