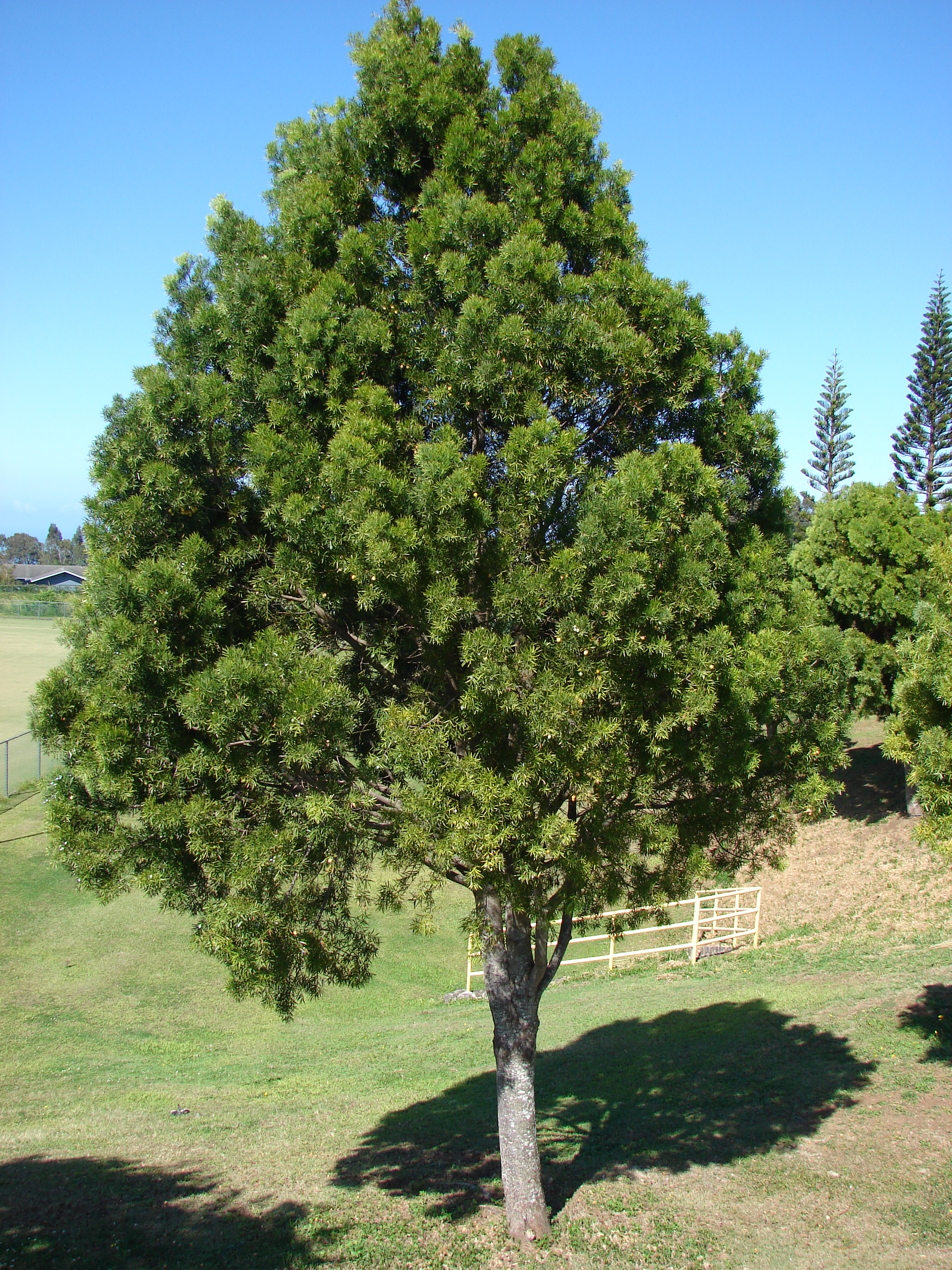

Conservation status
- Least Concern (IUCN 3.1)

Scientific classification
- Kingdom: Plantae
- Clade: Tracheophytes
- Clade: Gymnosperms
- Division: Pinophyta
- Class: Pinopsida
- Order: Araucariales
- Family: Podocarpaceae
- Genus: Afrocarpus
- Species: A. gracilior

Binomial name
- Afrocarpus gracilior (Pilg.) C.N.Page

Synonyms
- Podocarpus gracilior

= Afrocarpus gracilior =

Species of conifer

Afrocarpus gracilior is a species of coniferous tree in the family Podocarpaceae known as benet in Marakwet and East African yellowwood, African fern tree, or bastard yellowwood in English.

It is native to eastern Africa, in Ethiopia, Kenya, Tanzania, and Uganda, in Afromontane habitats.

It is a common species found in many types of tropical mountain forest habitat. It is a dominant species in some areas. Nevertheless, it may be in slow decline due to deforestation and logging.

== Description ==
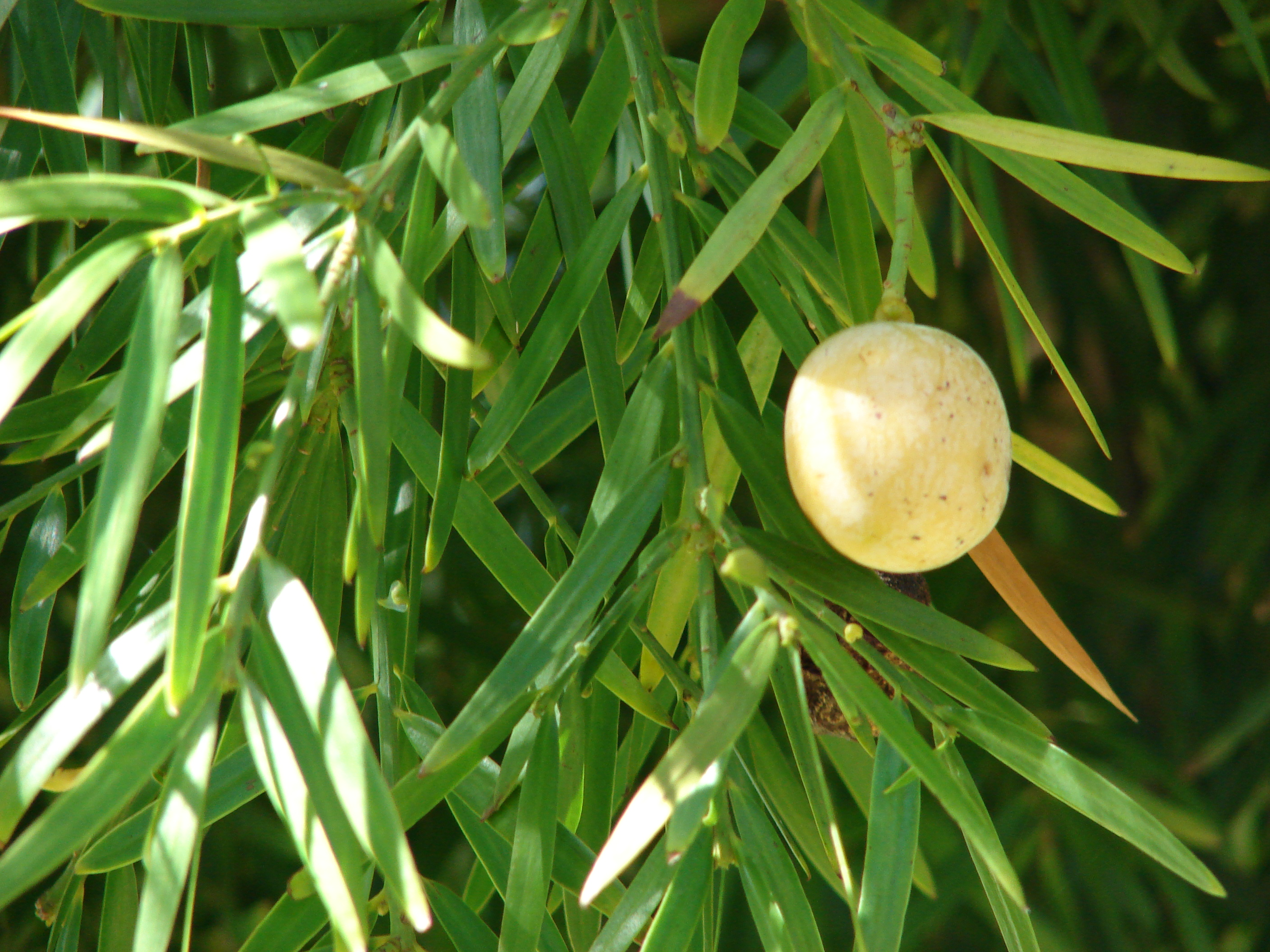
Afrocarpus gracilior cone and foliage.

Afrocarpus gracilior is a medium-sized tree, growing 20–40 m tall, rarely to 50 m, with a trunk diameter of 50–80 cm. The leaves are spirally arranged, lanceolate, 2–6 cm long and 3–5 mm broad on mature trees, larger, to 10 cm (4 in) long and 6 mm broad on vigorous young trees.

The seed cones are highly modified, with a single 2 cm (1 in) diameter seed with a thin fleshy coating borne on a short peduncle. The mature seed is purple, and is dispersed by birds and monkeys which eat the fleshy coating. The pollen cones are solitary or in clusters of two or three on a short stem.

== Taxonomy ==
Studies in 2000 and 2002 provided enough evidence to support splitting the genus Podocarpus into Podocarpus and Afrocarpus. Thus, P. falcatus and P. gracilior were renamed to A. falcatus and A. gracilior. Later DNA, biogeographical, morphological, and anatomical evidence suggested the following relationships between the species of Afrocarpus:

- Nageia (outgroup)
- Afrocarpus
  - - A. gracilior
    - A. mannii
  - - A. falcatus
    - - A. dawei
      - A. usambarensis

== Uses ==
It is an important timber tree in its native range, where it is harvested for local use and export. It is used for construction of buildings and furniture. It is grown in plantations elsewhere in the world.

It is cultivated as an ornamental tree, and planted as a shade tree.

== Notes ==
- Dallimore, W., & Jackson, A. B. (1966). A Handbook of Coniferae and Ginkgoaceae, 4th ed., revised. Edward Arnold.
