= Satinwood =

Satinwood may refer to:

Originally:

- Chloroxylon swietenia, Ceylon, Sri Lanka satinwood or East Indian satinwood
- Zanthoxylum flavum (Syn.: Fagara flava), West Indian, Jamaica, Florida or San Domingo satinwood

More generally, various other woods that can be polished to a high gloss:

- Brosimum rubescens, Red satinwood, Suriname satinwood
- Ceratopetalum apetalum, Scented satinwood
- Chloroxylon faho, Madagascar satinwood
- Chloroxylon swietenia, East Indian satinwood
- Cordia alliodora, Satinwood
- Diospyros ferrea (Syn.: Maba buxifolia), Satinwood
- Distemonanthus benthamianus, Yellow or Nigerian, African satinwood
- Euxylophora paraensis, Brazilian satinwood
- Lagerstroemia spp., Asian or Cambodian satinwood
- Liquidambar styraciflua, Satinwood, Nut satinwood
- Murraya exotica; Andaman satinwood
- Murraya paniculata, Satinwood, from Southeast Asia and Australia
- Nematolepis squamea, Satinwood from Australia
- Pericopsis elata, Yellow or African satinwood
- Rhodosphaera rhodanthema, Tulip or Golden satinwood
- Terminalia ivorensis, Satinwood
- Triplochiton scleroxylon, West African satinwood
- Turraeanthus africana, African satinwood
- Vitex lignum-vitae, Satinwood
- Zanthoxylum brachyacanthum, Satinwood
- Zanthoxylum fagara and Concha satinwood Zanthoxylum caribaeum; Florida, Bahama und West Indian satinwood
- Zanthoxylum gilletii, (East) African satinwood
- Zanthoxylum heitzii, Satinwood
