= Minziro Forest Reserve =

Forest reserve of Tanzania

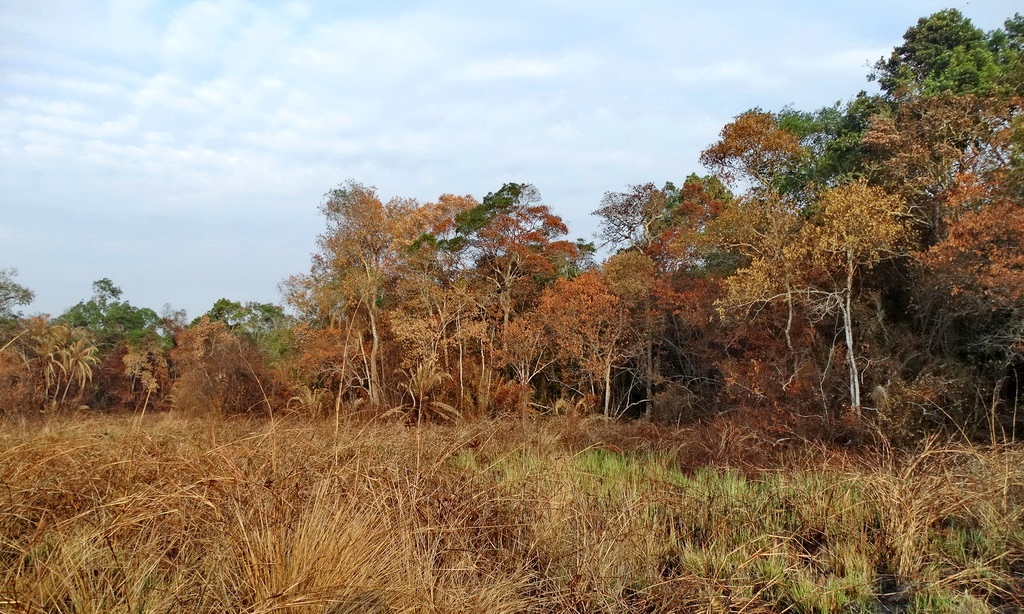
- Burnt ecotone of Minziro Forest

- Location within Tanzania
- Location: Missenyi District, Kagera Region, Tanzania
- Nearest city: Bukoba
- Coordinates: 01°06′21″S 31°30′58″E
- Area: 248.41 km^{2} (95.91 sq mi)

The Minziro (Nature) Forest Reserve is a 24,841 ha (95.91 sq mi) forest reserve in Tanzania along the Kagera River in Bukoba District of Kagera Region. It protects one of the largest forests in Tanzania, of a forest type that is unique in the country. It was gazetted in 1947 and is situated at an elevation of around 1,150 m (3,770 ft). in fairly level terrain. The forest is continuous with the Malabigambo Forest over the nearby Uganda border. The largest part consists of Baikiaea–Podocarpus seasonal swamp forests while the remainder is flooded acacia woodlands.

== Wildlife ==
The Minziro Forest is similar to forests found in the Congo and Guinea, and consequently it contains flora and fauna that reach their eastern range limits here.

Characteristic trees of swamp forests include Afrocarpus dawei, Heywoodia lucens, Mussaenda erythrophylla, Cassipourea ruwensorensis, Citropsis articulata, Manilkara obvata, Baikiaea insignis, and Uncaria africana.

58 of the 245 bird species recorded in the reserve are not found outside Kagera in Tanzania, while 56 of these have only been seen in Minziro. In addition, more than 600 butterfly species are native here, surpassing any other forest in Africa.

== Threats ==
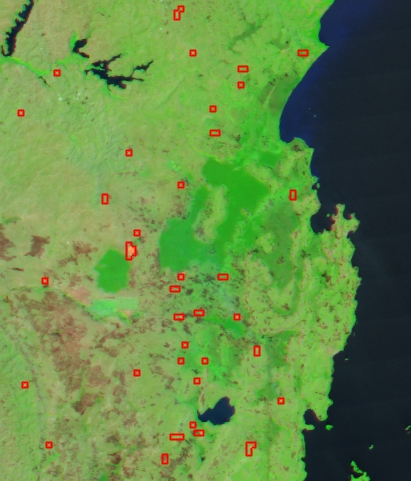
Satellite image of June 2004 showing wildfires in the vicinity of the forest (at center).

The forest was formerly extensively logged for the valuable Afrocarpus dawei trees, which are now scarce, with only small specimens remaining. Illegal logging is ongoing.

Pastoralists have been entering the central grasslands illegally in search of grazing. They burn the grasslands which is detrimental to the over-wintering population of blue swallows, and also affects vegetation in the forest-grassland ecotone. In 2017, the Bukoba magistrate's court fined one trespassing pastoralist, and expressed dismay at the escalating damage to the environment.
