= Baikiaea ghesquiereana =

Conservation status
- Endangered (IUCN 3.1)

Scientific classification
- Kingdom: Plantae
- Clade: Tracheophytes
- Clade: Angiosperms
- Clade: Eudicots
- Clade: Rosids
- Order: Fabales
- Family: Fabaceae
- Genus: Baikiaea
- Species: B. ghesquiereana

Binomial name
- Baikiaea ghesquiereana J. Léonard

Species of legume

Baikiaea ghesquiereana is a species of legume in the family Fabaceae. It is found only in Lindi Region of Tanzania. It is threatened by habitat loss.
