= Sango Bay forests =

Forests in southwestern Uganda

Sango Bay forests are distinctive forests found in southwestern Uganda, near the border with Tanzania. The Sango Bay forests grow on seasonally-flooded lowlands near on the lower reaches of the Kagera River, just west of where it empties into Lake Victoria (also known locally in Luganda as Lake 'Nnalubaale).

== Geography ==
The Sango Bay forests lie in Rakai District. They extend north and west of the lower Kagera River, on alluvial soils deposited by the river – predominantly clay, with sandy soils in the northern portion.

The town of Minziro lies in the center of the forested area, near the Tanzanian border. The towns of Kanabulemu and Sango Bay are on the forests' eastern edge.

== Climate ==
The climate of the region is tropical. Average annual rainfall ranges from 1,250 and 2,125 mm, with two rainy seasons. The main rainy season is from March to May, with shorter rains falling during September through November. Average annual temperatures range from 16º to 26 °C.

Seasonal floods occur during the March to May rainy season.

== Ecology ==
The Sango Bay forests are a forest-wetland ecosystem with swamp forests, Acacia woodlands, grasslands, and papyrus swamps.

The swamp forests, which extend into the adjacent Minziro Forest of Tanzania, are a distinctive plant community, blending characteristic species from the lowland Guineo-Congolian forests found further west in the Congo Basin with Afromontane species characteristic of Africa's mountains. Historically Baikieaea insignis subsp. minor and Afrocarpus dawei were the predominant canopy trees, although widespread logging has altered the species composition of the forest.

The forests are home to populations of the monkeys Ruwenzori colobus (Colobus angolensis ruwenzori) and Uganda mangabey (Lophocebus ugandae).

Savannas of Vachellia kirkii are found along seasonally-flooded riverbanks. Papyrus swamps grow in permanently-flooded areas along rivers.

The grasslands are predominantly the tussock grasses Miscanthidium violaceum, Loudetia kagerensis, and Themeda triandra.

== Sango Bay Forest Reserve ==
The Sango Bay Forest Reserve is a protected area covering 578 km². It consists of five blocks – Malabigambo (110.78 km²), Kaiso (18.93 km²), Namalala (23, 97 km²), Tero west (26.83km²) and Tero east (10.67 km²).

About 180 km² (31%) of the reserve is forested, while 400 km² (68.9%) is grassland.

Despite its official protected status, unregulated logging has depleted the forests in the reserve, altering the forest structure and its species composition. Afrocarpus dawei, once a dominant canopy tree, is now scarce.
