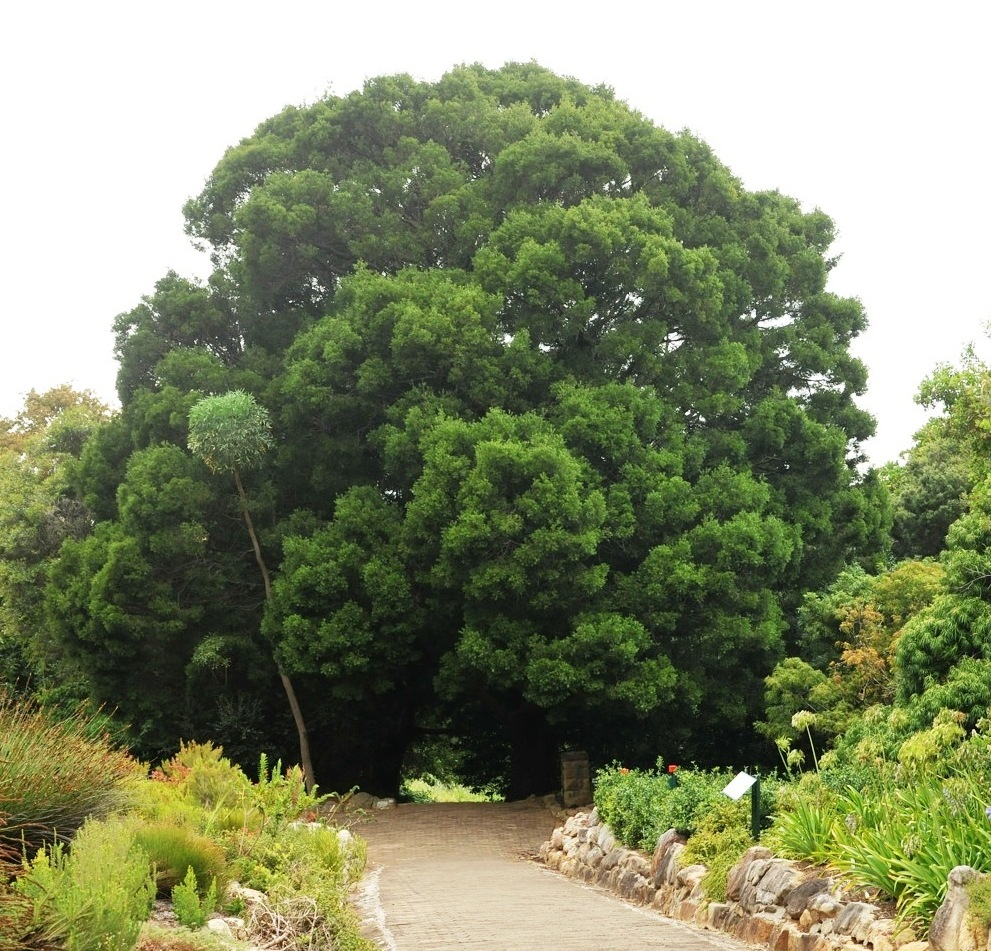
- Afrocarpus falcatus

Scientific classification
- Kingdom: Plantae
- Clade: Tracheophytes
- Clade: Gymnosperms
- Division: Pinophyta
- Class: Pinopsida
- Order: Araucariales
- Family: Podocarpaceae
- Genus: Afrocarpus (J.Buchholz & N.E.Gray) C.N.Page

Type species
- Afrocarpus falcatus (Thunberg) C.N.Page

Species
- 5 – see text

= Afrocarpus =

Genus of conifers

Afrocarpus is a genus of conifers in the family Podocarpaceae, native to Africa. Five species are recognized. Afrocarpus was designated a genus in 1989, when several species formerly classified in Podocarpus and Nageia were reclassified.

== Taxonomy ==
Afrocarpus was originally erected in 1948 as a section of the genus Podocarpus, following a review of the latter by botanists John Theodore Buchholz and Netta Elizabeth Gray. It was raised to genus status by Christopher Nigel Page in 1989, a move well supported by more recent studies. In a 2009 treatment of the genus, only two species were recognized; A. dawei, A. gracilior, and A. usambarensis were sunk into A. falcatus. The reason for this merger was that "variation across the group appears to be essentially continuous". As of June 2025, The Gymnosperm Database accepts the five species listed here.

Afrocarpus gaussenii was based on a single specimen of a cultivated individual of Afrocarpus falcatus in Madagascar. Its distinctive features might have resulted from the conditions of its cultivation. No species of Afrocarpus is known to be native to Madagascar.

Studies based on anatomical, biogeographical, morphological, and DNA evidence suggest the following relationships:

Knopf 2012

- Afrocarpus
  - - A. gracilior
    - A. mannii
  - - A. falcatus
    - - A. dawei
      - A. usambarensis

Stull 2021

- Afrocarpus
  - A. mannii (Hooker) Page
  - - A. gracilior (Pilger) Page
    - - A. falcatus (Thunberg) Gaussen ex Page
      - - A. dawei (Stapf) Page
        - A. usambarensis (Pilger) Page

=== Species ===
Image	Scientific name	Common name	Distribution	Description
	Afrocarpus dawei		Kenya, Tanzania, Uganda, and the Congo	Native to the highlands of east Africa
	Afrocarpus falcatus	common yellowwood, bastard yellowwood, outeniqua yellowwood, African fern pine, weeping yew	South Africa, Swellendam District of Western Cape Province to Limpopo Province, and into southern Mozambique	Commonly known as the Outeniqua yellowwood, is a tall tree, generally 10–25 m high, but growing up to 60 m. It is native to montane forests
	Afrocarpus gracilior	East African yellowwood	Ethiopia, Kenya, Tanzania, and Uganda	Used in gardens as a tree, hedge, screen, or espalier; generally, it is sold as Podocarpus gracilior.
	Afrocarpus mannii	Pinheiro de São Tomé (lit. São Tomé pine)	São Tomé Island in the Gulf of Guinea	
	Afrocarpus usambarensis	Usambara yellowwood	Burundi, Rwanda, the Congo, and Lushoto and Mbulu districts of Tanzania.	

== Description ==
Afrocarpus are evergreen trees. The individuals of the largest species, Afrocarpus falcatus, may reach a height of 60 meters. The thin bark often peels with scale-like plates.

The leaves are simple and flat. The phyllotaxis or leaf arrangement is usually spiral but may be opposite on young plants. The leaves are generally lanceolate in shape and coriaceous in texture. They have a single visible midrib. Stomata are found on both surfaces of the leaf.

Afrocarpus are dioecious, with male pollen cones and female seed cones borne on separate individual plants. The cones are short pedunculate and usually develop from axillary buds.

The male pollen cones are narrowly cylindrical and resemble catkins. They grow in small groups of two or three cones. The peduncles are glabrous. Each pollen cone has numerous spirally inserted microsporophylls each with two basal pollen sacs producing bisaccate pollen.

The female seed cones are solitary. Their peduncles may have small scale leaves. The cones consist of several sterile cone scales and one fertile cone scale with just one seed producing ovule. The sterile scales wither as the cone matures, unlike in the closely related genus Podocarpus where the scales fuse to form a fleshy receptacle. A part of the scale supporting the ovule develops into a rounded fleshy covering enclosing the seed entirely known as the epimatium. At maturity the epimatium varies in shape from subglobose to elliptic or obovoid and in color from greenish to yellow or brown.

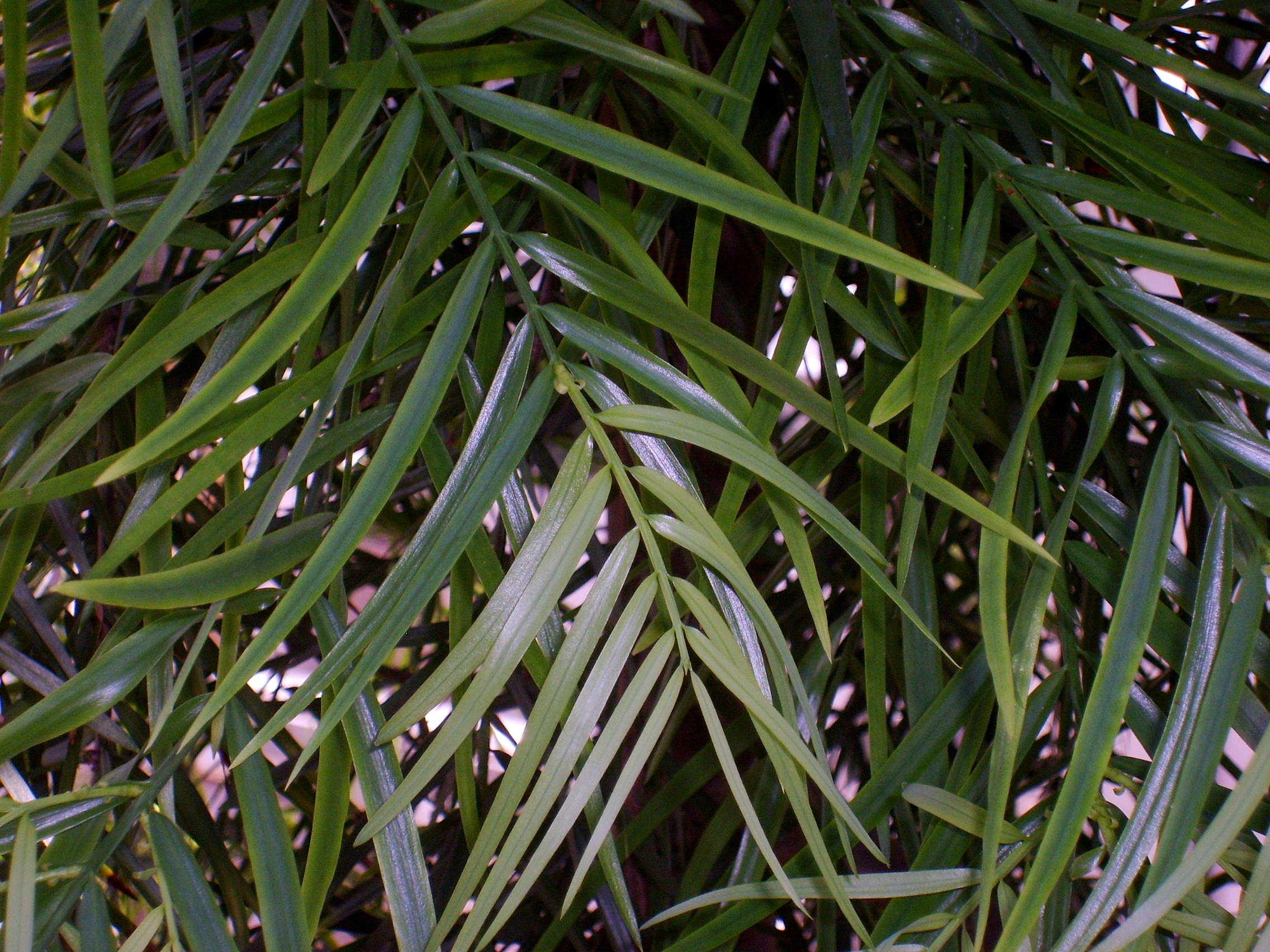
The long lanceolate to sometimes falcate leaves of A. falcatus.

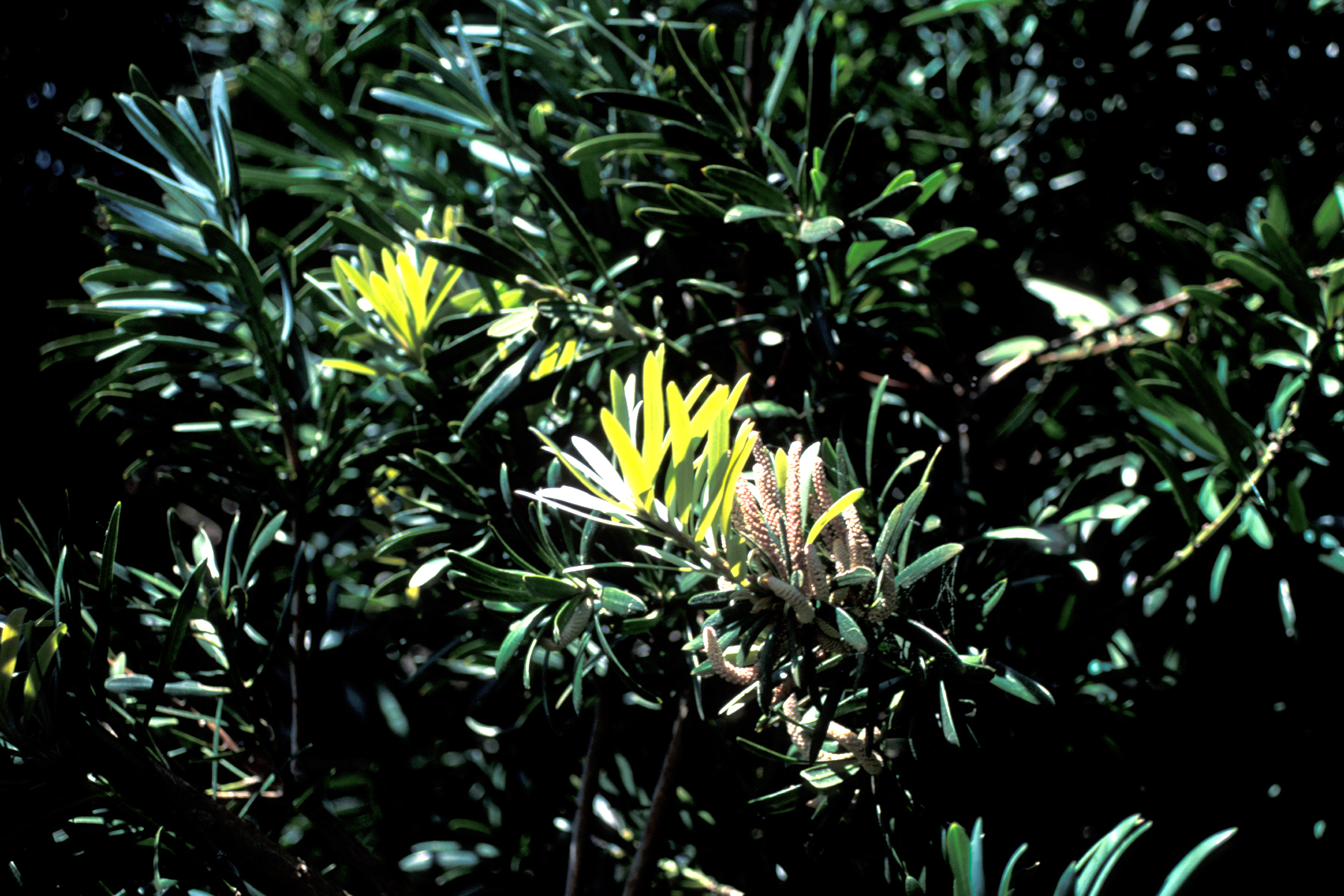
A. gracilior male cones growing in clusters.

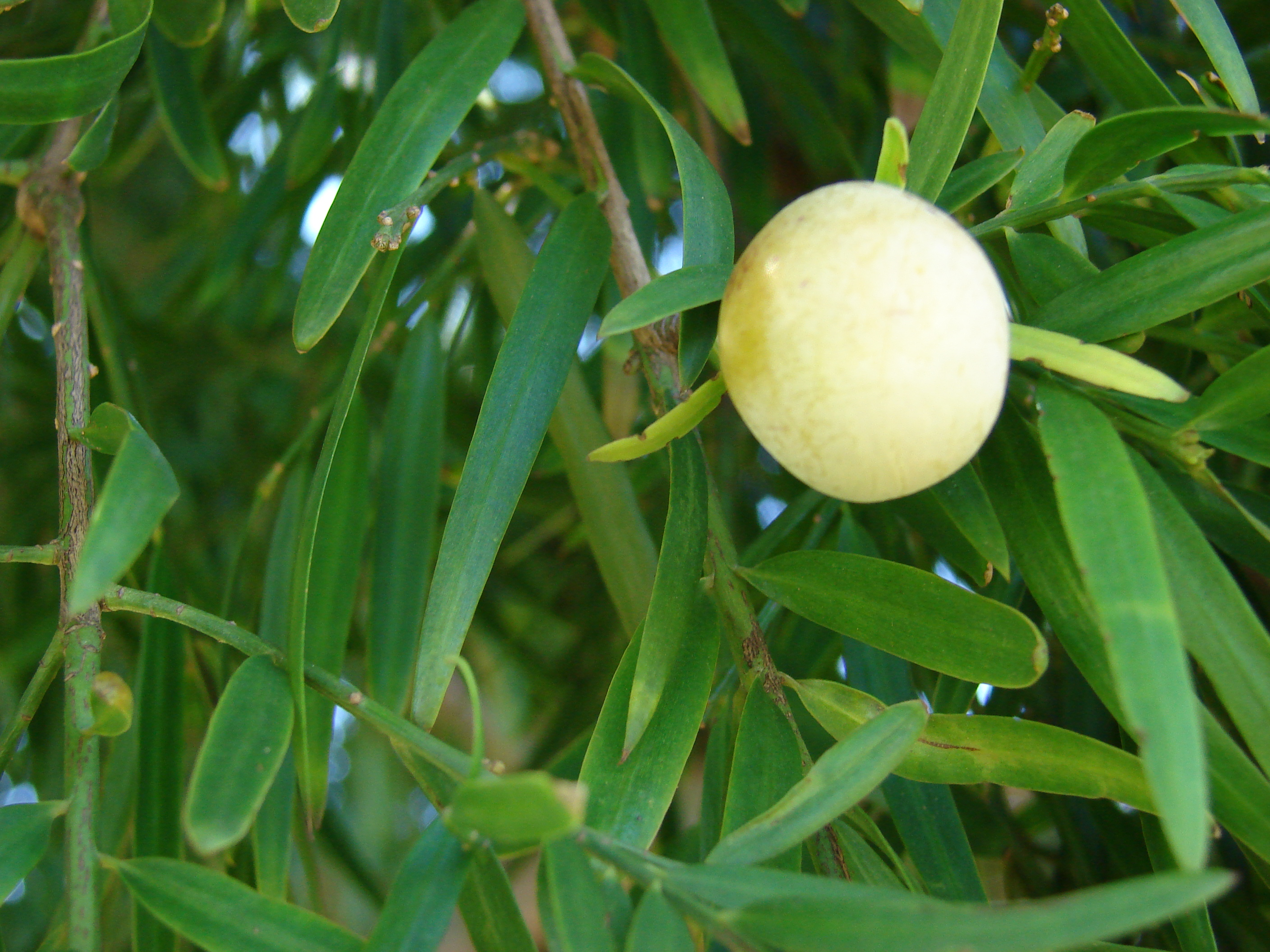
An A. gracilior cone showing a yellow epimatium around the seed.

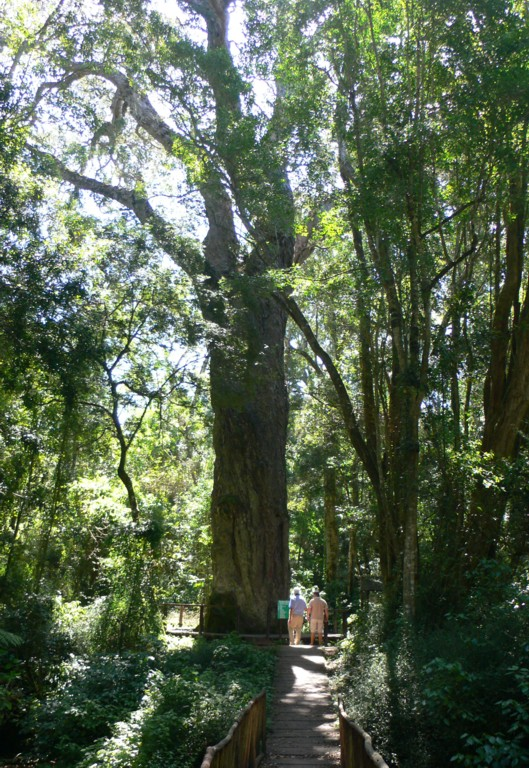
A very large tree of A. falcatus.

== Distribution ==
As the name intimates, Afrocarpus is native to Africa. The species are distributed through the Afromontane forests of eastern and southern Africa, descending to the Indian Ocean coast in South Africa. The genus is native to Burundi, Democratic Republic of the Congo, Eswatini, Ethiopia, Kenya, Malawi, Mozambique, Rwanda, São Tomé and Príncipe, South Africa, Tanzania and Uganda.

The podocarps are associated with the ancient supercontinent of Gondwana, where they were characteristic of the cool, moist southern Gondwana flora. Gondwana broke up into the continents of South America, Africa, India, Australia, and Antarctica between 160 and 30 million years ago. As Africa drifted north, it became hotter and drier, and the podocarps generally retreated to the cool, moist highlands of eastern and southern Africa.

== Uses ==
In South Africa, this wood is mostly used to make exclusive furniture.
