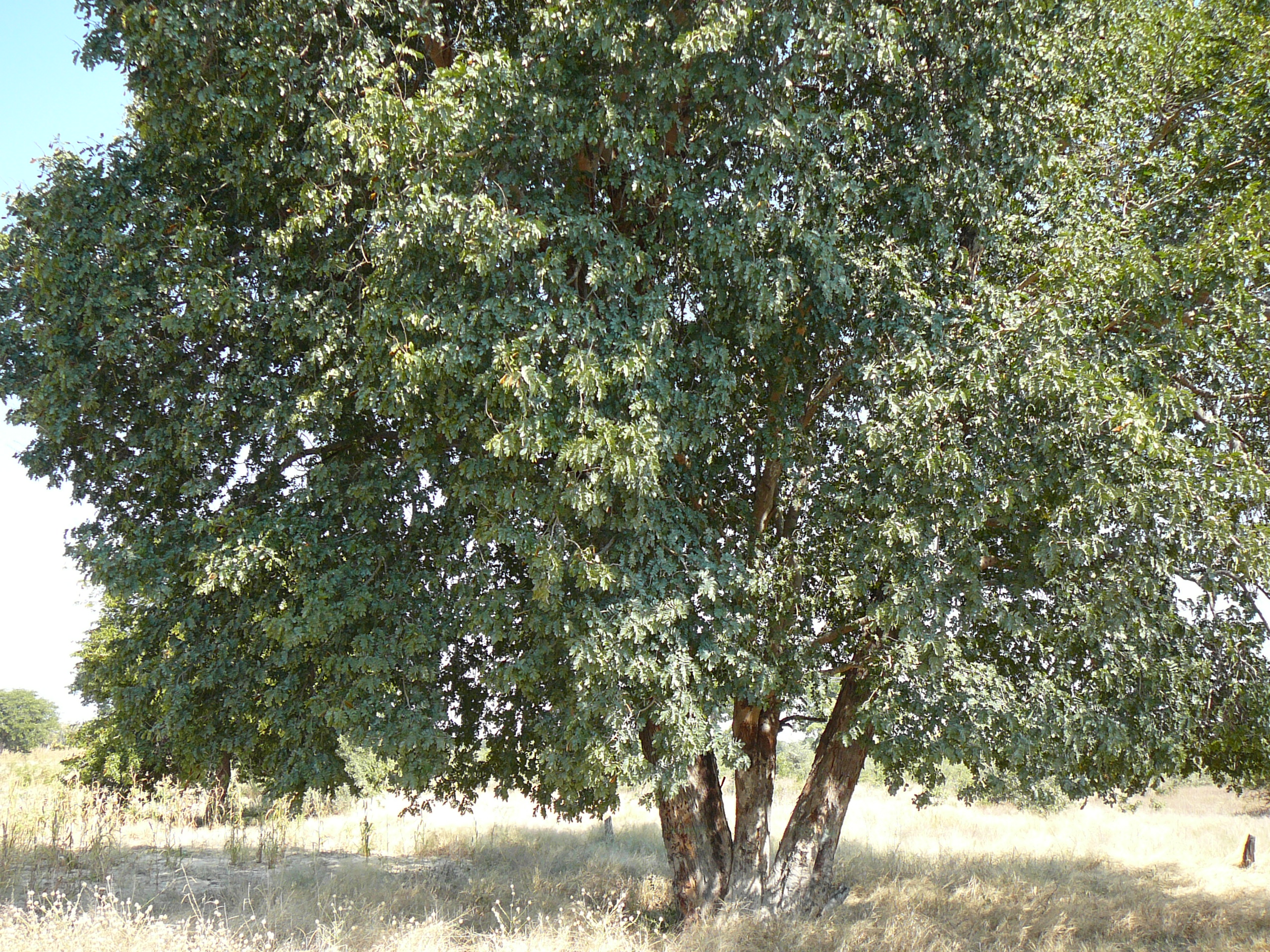
- Baikiaea plurijuga in Namibia

Scientific classification
- Kingdom: Plantae
- Clade: Tracheophytes
- Clade: Angiosperms
- Clade: Eudicots
- Clade: Rosids
- Order: Fabales
- Family: Fabaceae
- Subfamily: Detarioideae
- Tribe: Detarieae
- Genus: Baikiaea; Benth. (1865)

Species
- Baikiaea ghesquiereana J.Léonard; Baikiaea insignis Benth.; Baikiaea plurijuga Harms; Baikiaea robynsii Ghesq. ex Laing; Baikiaea suzannae Ghesq.; Baikiaea zenkeri Harms

= Baikiaea =

Genus of legumes

Baikiaea is a genus of flowering plants in the legume family, Fabaceae. It includes six species of trees native to sub-Saharan Africa. Species range from Nigeria eastwards to Uganda and Tanzania and south to Zimbabwe, Botswana, and Namibia. Habitats range from lowland tropical rain forest to seasonally dry forest and woodland or savannas on well-drained soils.

Six species are accepted:

- Baikiaea ghesquiereana J.Léonard – eastern lowland Tanzania
- Baikiaea insignis Benth. – Nigeria through Central Africa to Uganda, Tanzania, and Angola
- Baikiaea plurijuga – Rhodesian-teak – On Kalahari sands in the Zambezi Basin of Angola, Namibia, Botswana, Zambia, and Zimbabwe
- Baikiaea robynsii Ghesq. ex Laing mainland Equatorial Guinea and Gabon to Republic of the Congo and Democratic Republic of the Congo
- Baikiaea suzannae Ghesq. – Democratic Republic of the Congo
- Baikiaea zenkeri Harms – Cameroon

Baikiaea plurijuga is the characteristic tree of two dry woodland ecoregions of southern Africa, the Kalahari Acacia-Baikiaea woodlands and Zambezian Baikiaea woodlands, where it can grow in near-monodominant stands.

The genus is named after William Balfour Baikie (1824-1864), Scottish explorer of the Niger River.
