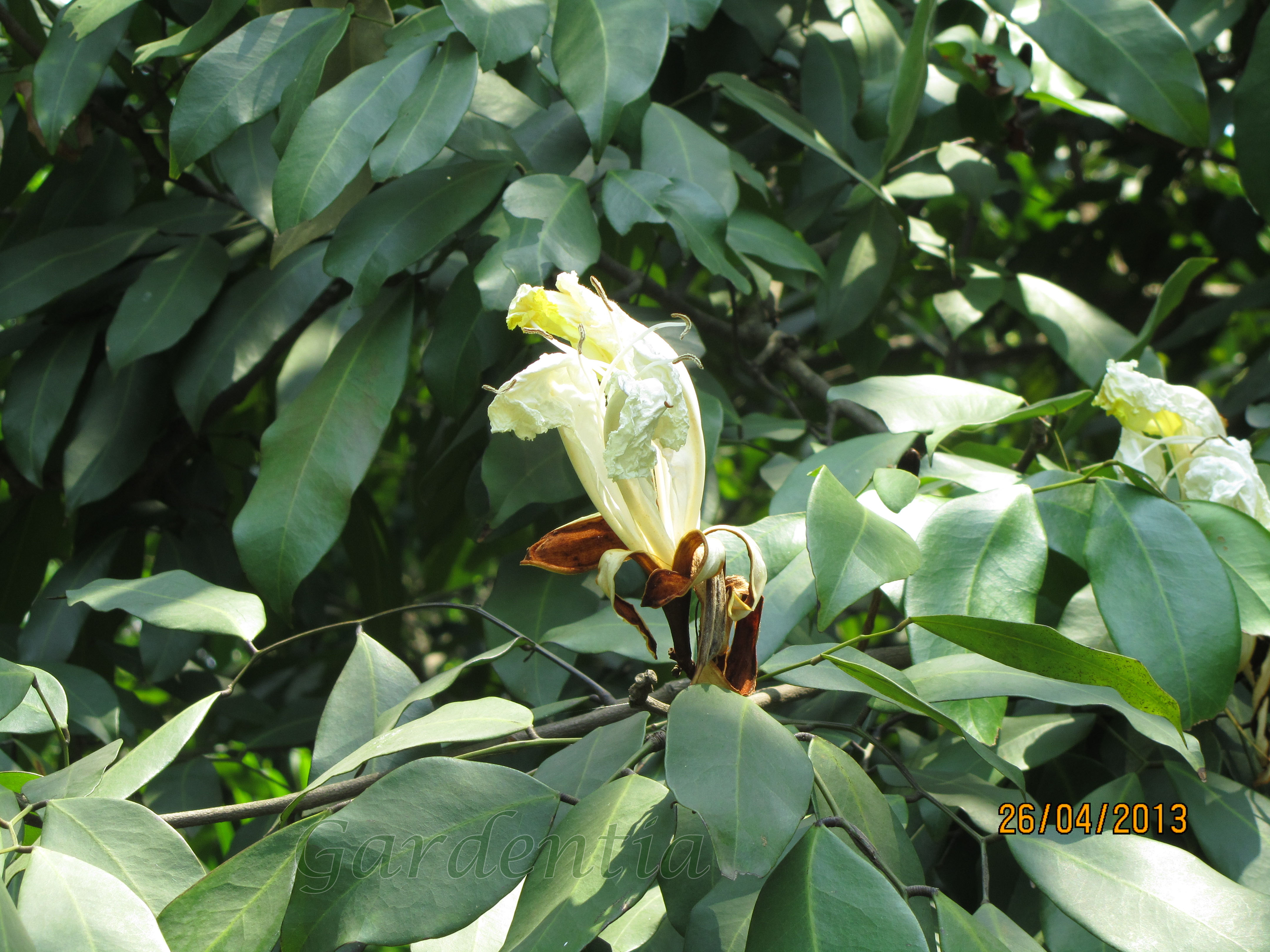

Scientific classification
- Kingdom: Plantae
- Clade: Tracheophytes
- Clade: Angiosperms
- Clade: Eudicots
- Clade: Rosids
- Order: Fabales
- Family: Fabaceae
- Genus: Baikiaea
- Species: B. insignis

Binomial name
- Baikiaea insignis Bentham

= Baikiaea insignis =

Species of legume

Baikiaea insignis is a species of legume in the family Fabaceae.

Baikiaea insignis ranges through the Guineo-Congolian region into eastern Africa, from Senegal through Nigeria, Cameroon, Equatorial Guinea, Gabon, Republic of the Congo, Democratic Republic of the Congo, northern Angola, Uganda, Kenya, Rwanda, Burundi, and Tanzania. It has very large flowers; the four white petals each being up to 20 cm (7.9 in) long and up to 7 cm (2.8 in) wide, with the yellow fifth petal only half as big. With a total width of 40 cm (16 in) it is possibly the widest flower in Africa, and among the largest known tree-borne flowers, (but also see Pachira insignis).

Baikiaea insignis is found in a range of plant communities, from sea level up to 1,800 metres elevation. It is found in rainforests, periodically flooded riparian forests with Uapaca heudelotii and Irvingia smithii, gallery forests, upland and mountain forests, and swamp forests.

Baikiaea insignis subsp. minor, commonly known as Nkobakoba or Nkoba, is a subspecies found in Bukoba district of Tanzania and the South Buddu forests of Uganda. B. insignis minor and Afrocarpus dawei are the dominant canopy trees in Minziro and Sango Bay forests, a distinctive swamp forest community found along the lower reaches of the Kagera River west of Lake Victoria, on the border of Tanzania and Uganda.

== Gallery ==
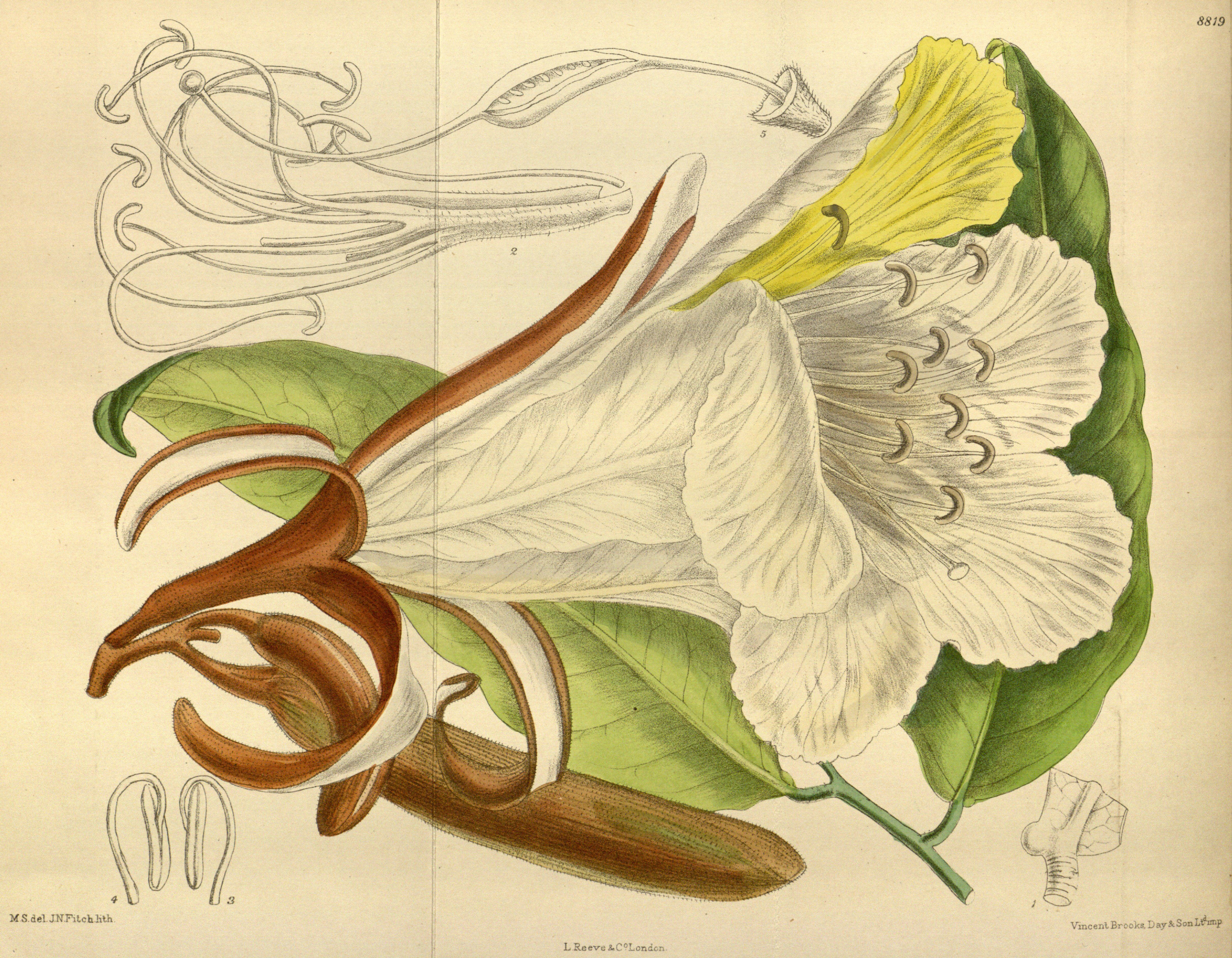
Lithograph of B. insignis by J.N. Fitch in Curtis's Botanical Magazine, London., vol. 145 of 1919.

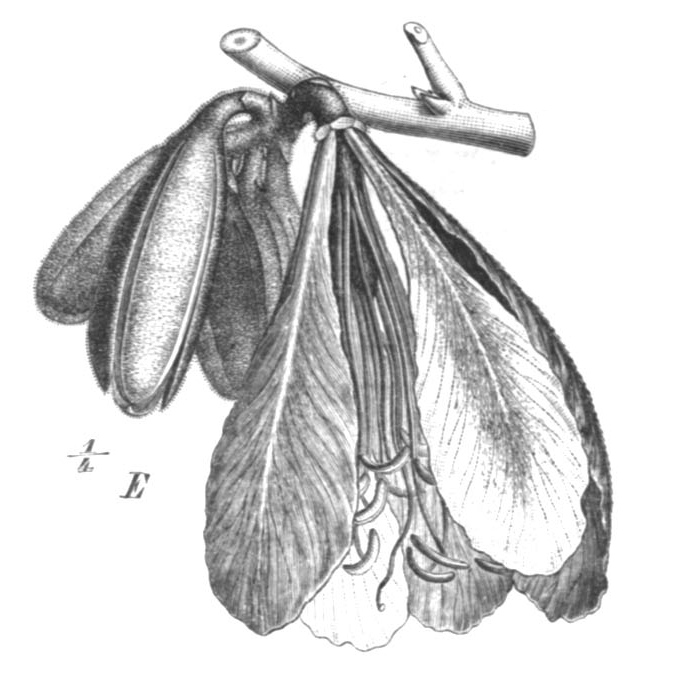
Illustration from book "Natürliche Pflanzenfamilien. Vol. III, 3." (1891) by Paul Hermann Wilhelm Taubert (1862-1897).
