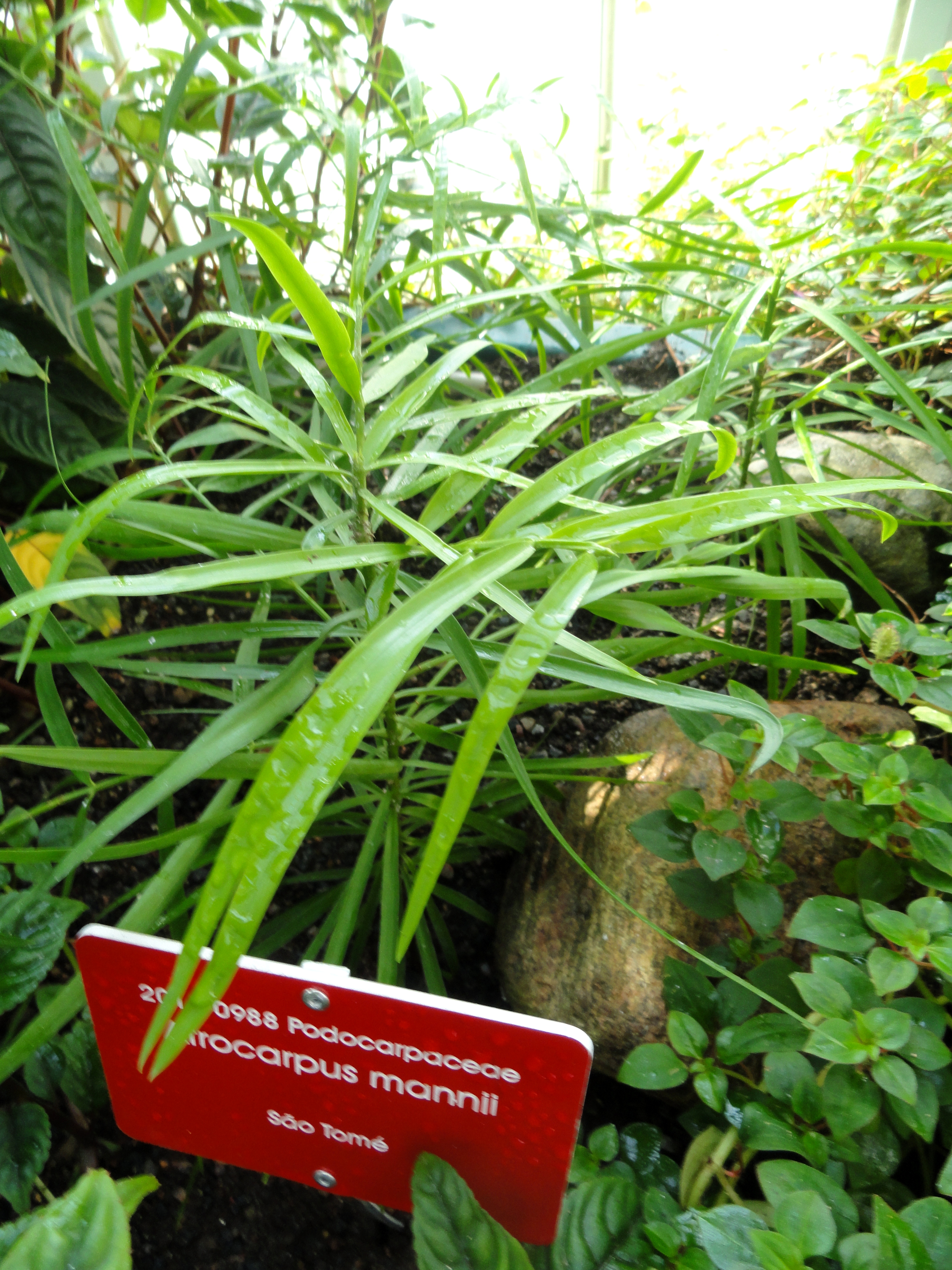

Conservation status
- Endangered (IUCN 3.1)

Scientific classification
- Kingdom: Plantae
- Clade: Tracheophytes
- Clade: Gymnosperms
- Division: Pinophyta
- Class: Pinopsida
- Order: Araucariales
- Family: Podocarpaceae
- Genus: Afrocarpus
- Species: A. mannii

Binomial name
- Afrocarpus mannii (Hook.f.) C.N.Page
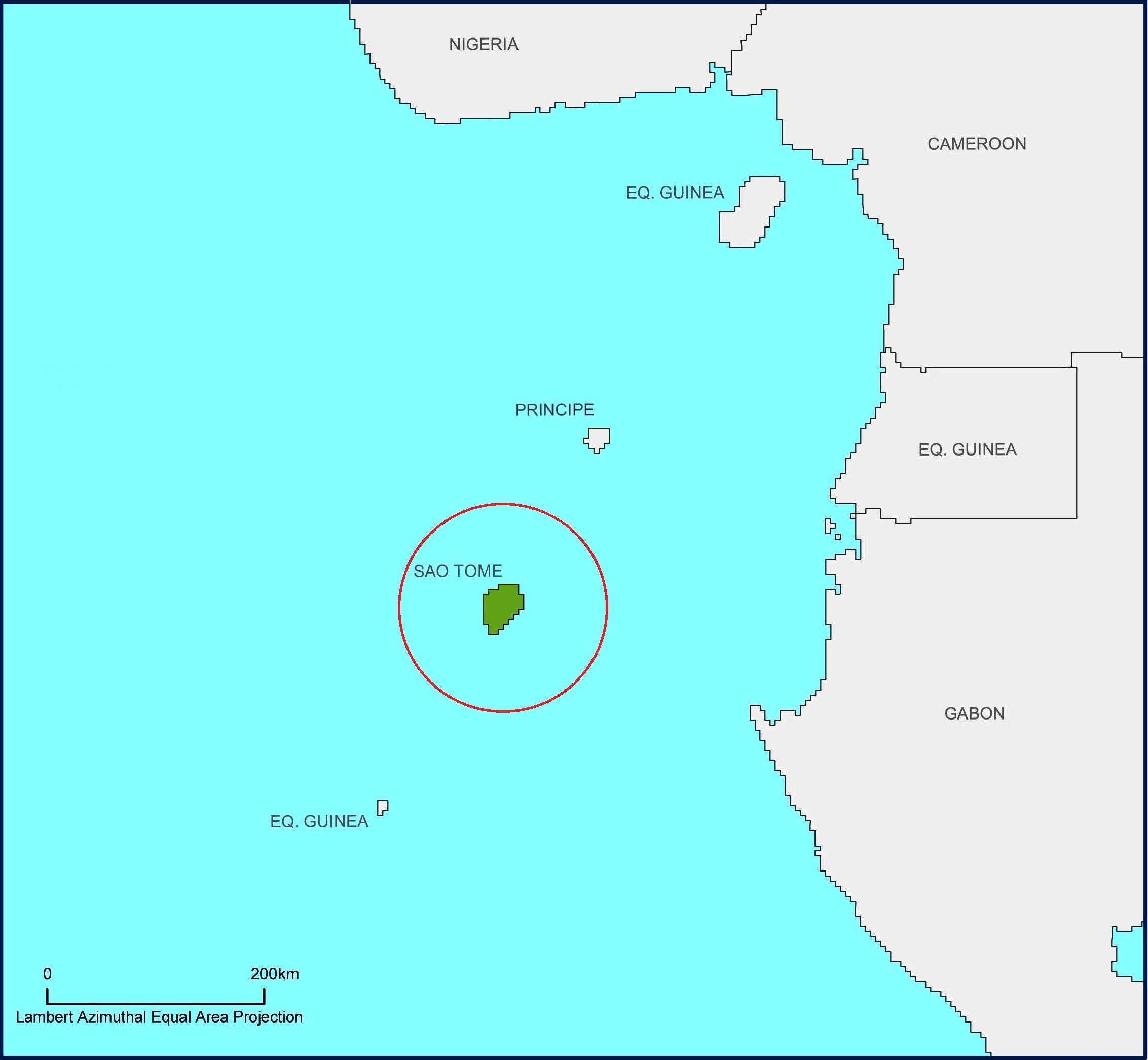
- São Tomé island, where A. mannii's only habitat is located.

Synonyms
- Decussocarpus mannii (Hook.f.) de Laub.; Nageia mannii (Hook.f.) Kuntze; Podocarpus mannii Hook.f.

= Afrocarpus mannii =

Species of conifer

Afrocarpus mannii is a species of coniferous tree in the family Podocarpaceae, native to the Afromontane forests of São Tomé Island in the Gulf of Guinea, growing on Pico de São Tomé at elevations of 1,300 m (4,300 ft) up to the summit at 2,024 m (6,640 ft). This is the only gymnosperm found on São Tomé and Príncipe. It was formerly classified as Podocarpus mannii.

It is a small tree, growing 10–15 m tall. The leaves are spirally arranged, lanceolate, 6–8 cm long on mature trees, larger, to 15 cm long and 2 cm broad, on vigorous young trees. The seed cones are highly modified, with a single 2 cm diameter seed with a thin fleshy coating borne on a short peduncle. The pollen cones are 1.5–2.5 cm long, solitary or in pairs on a short stem.
