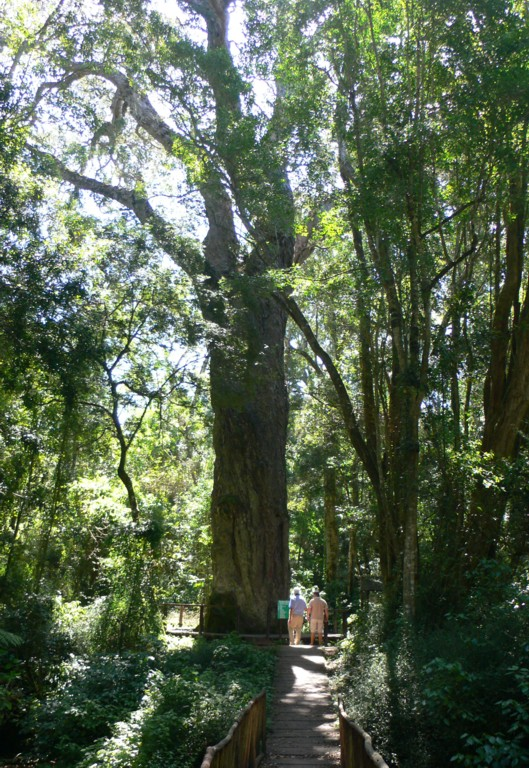
- The Big Tree, a specimen in Garden Route National Park

Conservation status
- Least Concern (IUCN 3.1)

Scientific classification
- Kingdom: Plantae
- Clade: Tracheophytes
- Clade: Gymnosperms
- Division: Pinophyta
- Class: Pinopsida
- Order: Araucariales
- Family: Podocarpaceae
- Genus: Afrocarpus
- Species: A. falcatus

Binomial name
- Afrocarpus falcatus (Thunb.) C.N.Page

Synonyms
- Afrocarpus gaussenii Podocarpus falcatus Taxus falcata

= Afrocarpus falcatus =

Species of conifer

Afrocarpus falcatus, the common yellowwood, or bastard yellowwood, outeniqua yellowwood, African pine tree, weeping yew, Afrikaans: outeniekwageelhout, kalander Sotho: mogôbagôba Xhosa: umkhoba Zulu: umsonti is a species of coniferous tree in the family Podocarpaceae. It is native to the montane forests of southern Africa, where it is distributed in Malawi, Mozambique, South Africa, and Eswatini. It is widespread, in some areas abundant, and not considered threatened, but it is a protected tree in South Africa. It is grown as an ornamental tree, especially in South Africa, and occasionally abroad.

== Description ==
Afrocarpus falcatus is a large coniferous tree often growing up to about 45 metres (148 ft) tall, but known to reach 60 m (200 ft). At higher elevations and in exposed, coastal habitat it rarely exceeds 25 m (82 ft) tall. The trunk can be 2 to 3 m (6 ft 7 in to 9 ft 10 in) wide, and is gray-brown to reddish. It is smooth and ridged on young stems, but increasingly flaky on older trunks. The leaves are arranged in spirals on the branches. They are small and narrow, up to 4.5 cm (1.8 in) long by about 6 mm (1/4 in) wide. They are green to yellowish, hairless, and leathery and somewhat waxy in texture. It is a dioecious species, with male and female structures on separate plants. The male cone is brown with spiralling scales and measures 5 to 15 mm (0.20 to 0.59 in) long by 3 mm (1/8 in) wide. It grows from the leaf axils. The female cone has one scale bearing one seed about 1 to 2 cm (0.39 to 0.79 in) long. The gray-green seed is drupe-like with a woody coat covered in a fleshy, resinous skin.

Some of the largest individuals occur in the Knysna-Amatole montane forests, where some specimens are over 1,000 years old.

== Biology ==
Female trees bear their cones irregularly, only every few years. The fleshy epimatium of the cone covers all of the seed, and ripens to a yellow colour, when it acquires a soft, jelly-like consistency. The main agents of seed dispersal are fruit bats, which eat the fleshy covering but discard the hard, woody seed. Many birds feed on the seeds, such as Cape parrot, purple-crested turaco, Knysna turaco, Ross's turaco, African olive pigeon, African green pigeon, and eastern bronze-naped pigeon. Animals that feed on the seeds include colobus monkeys, bushpigs, hornbills, turacos, and rodents. These may not be effective seed dispersal agents, because it appears that seeds that have gone through animal guts do not germinate well.

The tree has been found to host arbuscular mycorrhizae.

It may grow as a solitary tree, in small clusters, or in wide monotypic stands. It is associated with African juniper (Juniperus procera).

== Uses ==
The wood, often called podo or yellowwood, is good for construction, particularly shipbuilding. It is also made into plywood and used to make many products, including furniture, boxes, vats, toys, farm implements, musical instruments, and railroad ties. It is used in the construction of houses. It is also used as firewood. Some examples of South African yellowwood antique woodworking were created with the wood of this tree. The wood is also used for making floor boards and parquet blocks. The bark contains 3-4% tannin and is used for tanning leather. The wood is useful, but not very durable, as it is susceptible to blue stain fungus, powderpost beetles, longhorn beetles, and termites.

The seed is edible, but resinous. The bark and seeds have been used in traditional African medicine. The tree is cultivated as an ornamental and a windbreak, and to prevent erosion. It has been used as a Christmas tree.

== Conservation ==
The species has been vulnerable to logging, a practice which likely claimed many large, ancient specimens. In parts of South Africa logging has ceased, but in other regions the situation is not known. In general, it is not considered a current threat.

== Gallery ==
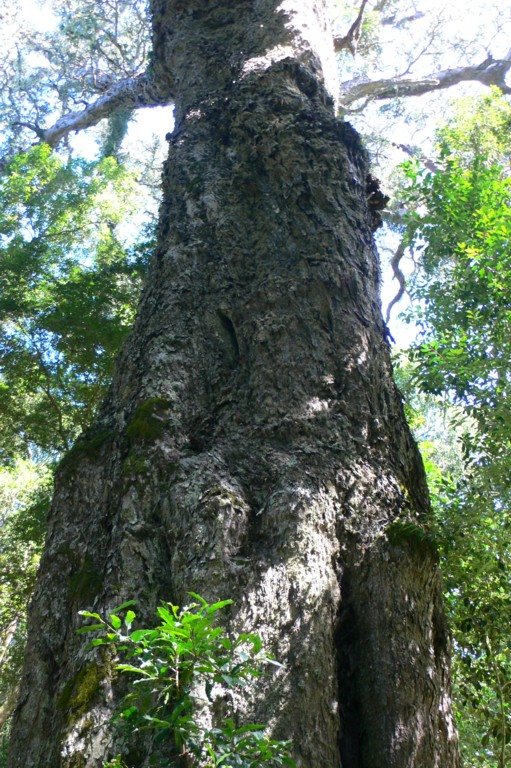
The Big Tree

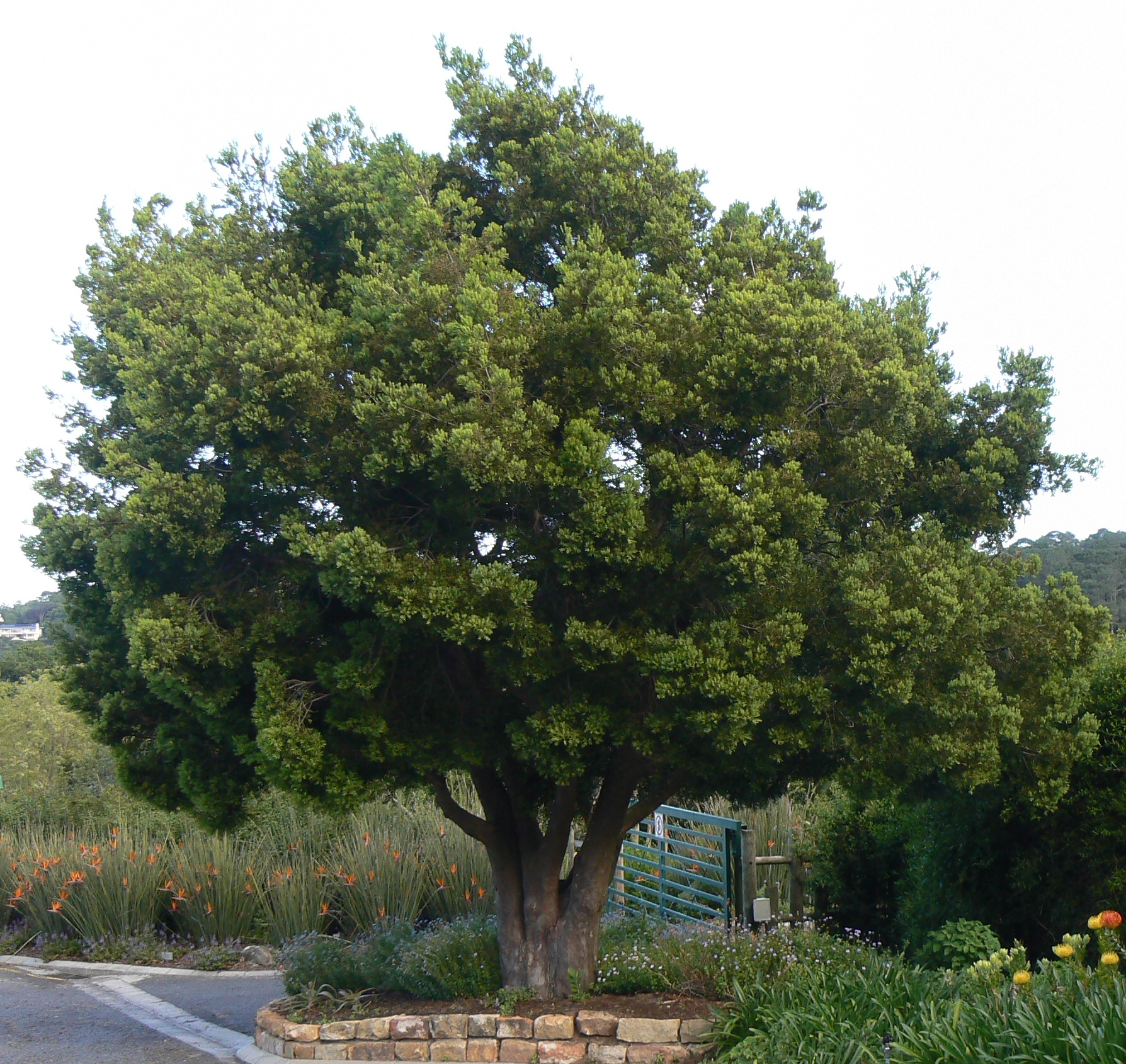
in Cape Town

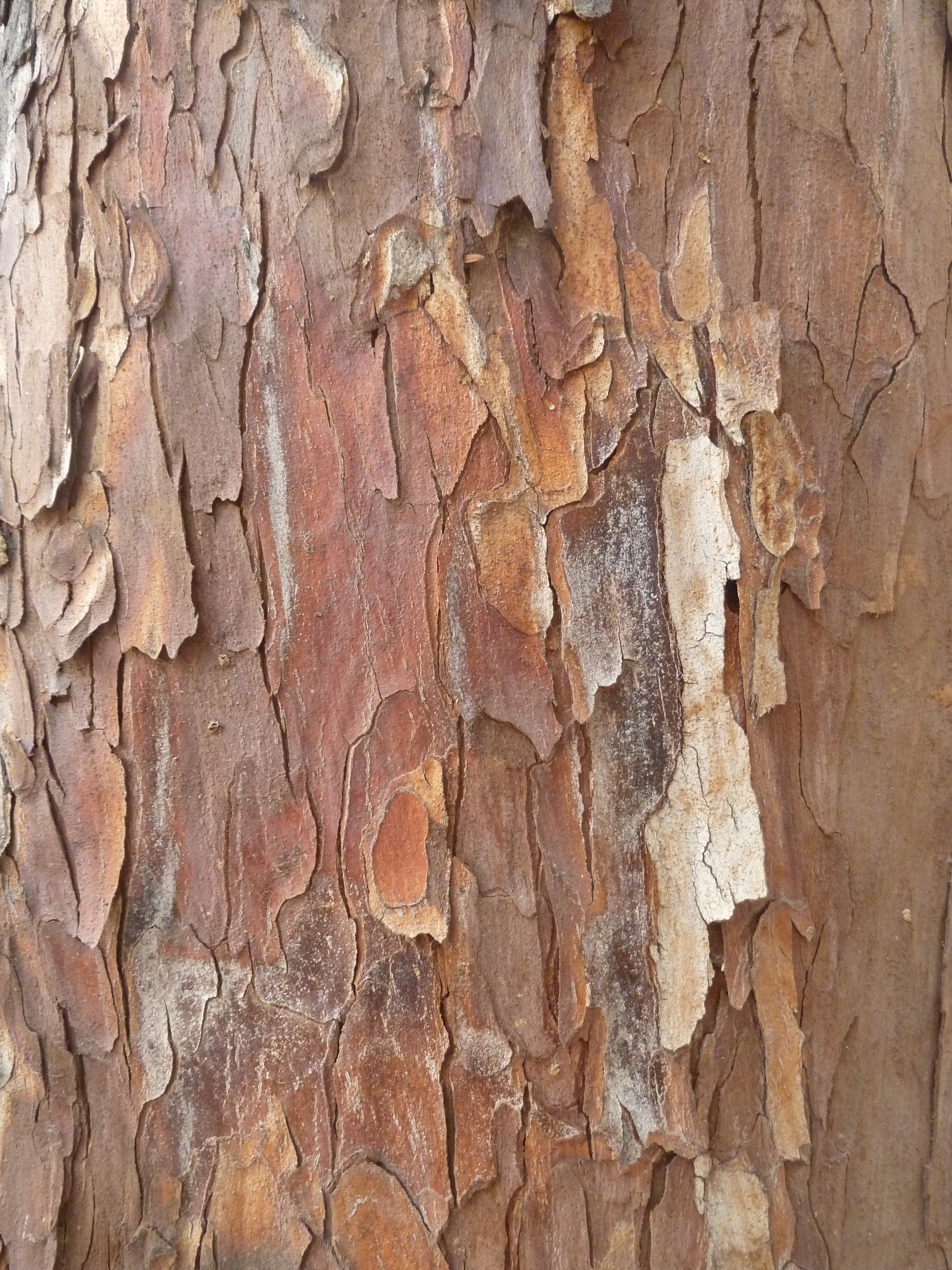
Bark texture

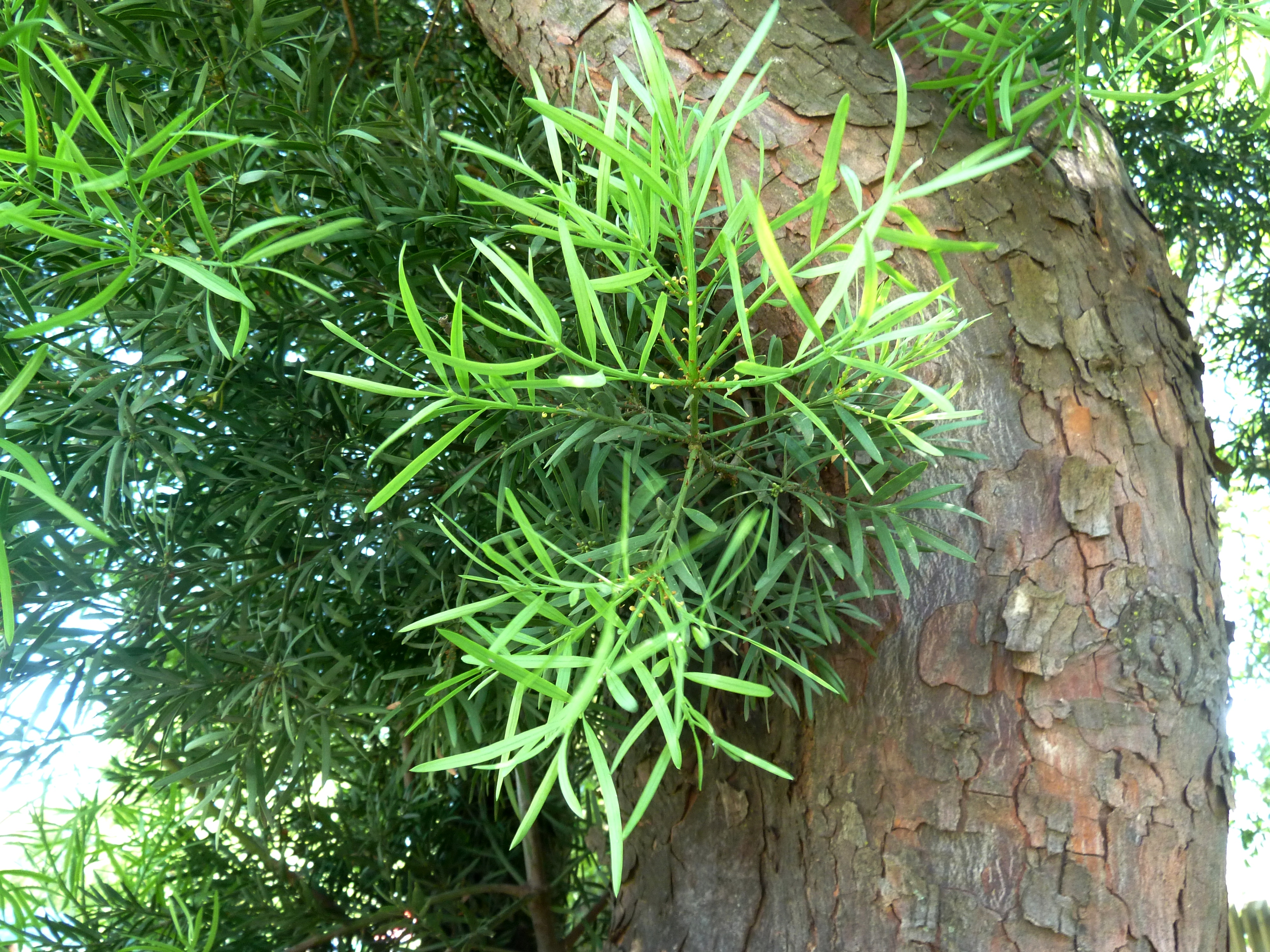
Foliage and bark

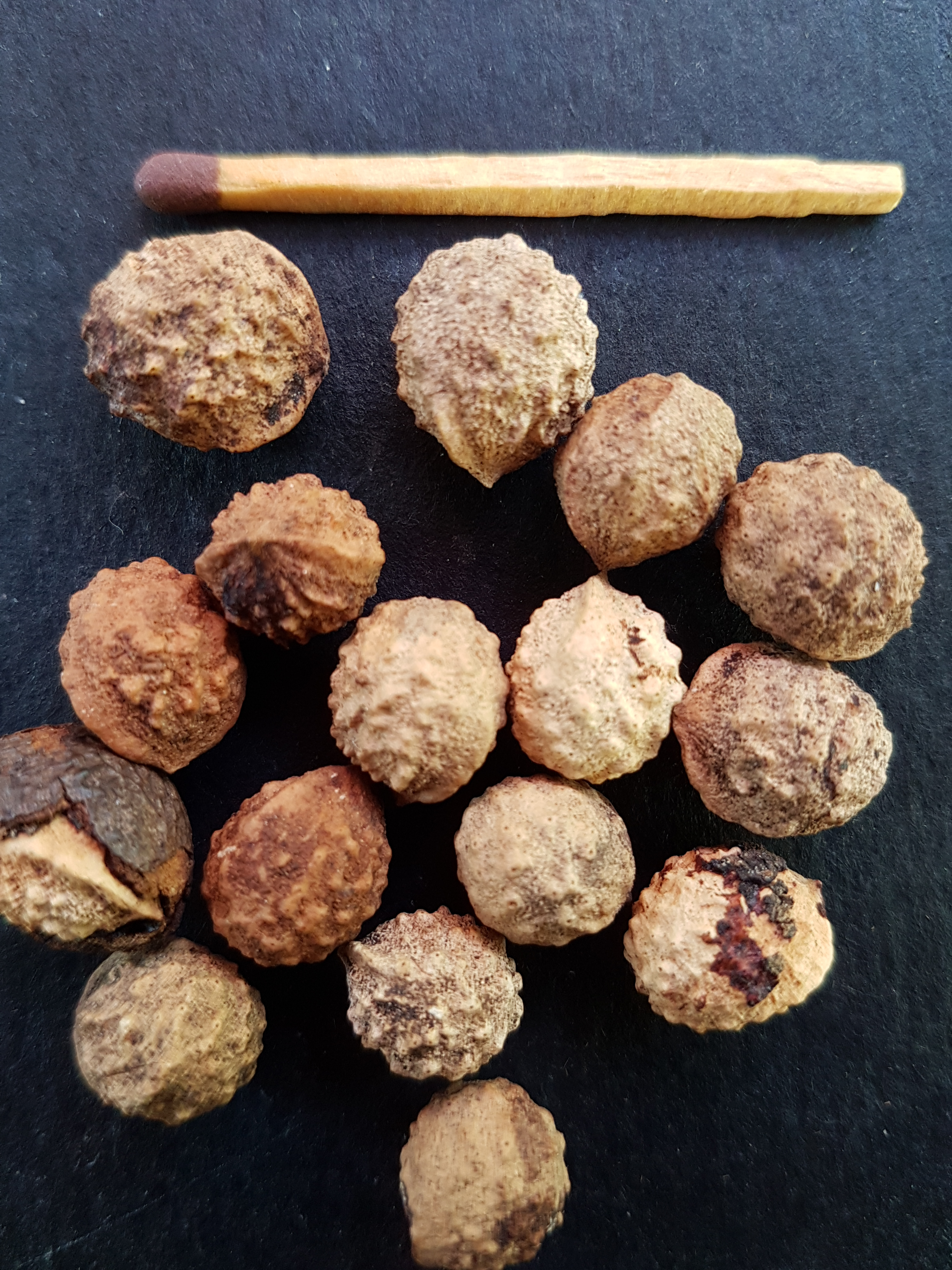
Seeds
