= Afrocarpus usambarensis =

Conservation status
- Endangered (IUCN 3.1)

Scientific classification
- Kingdom: Plantae
- Clade: Tracheophytes
- Clade: Gymnosperms
- Division: Pinophyta
- Class: Pinopsida
- Order: Araucariales
- Family: Podocarpaceae
- Genus: Afrocarpus
- Species: A. usambarensis

Binomial name
- Afrocarpus usambarensis Pilg. C.N. Page

Species of conifer

Afrocarpus usambarensis is a species of coniferous tree in the family Podocarpaceae, endemic to Tanzania in Afromontane habitats. It is among the tallest trees in Africa, reaching 75 metres in height.
