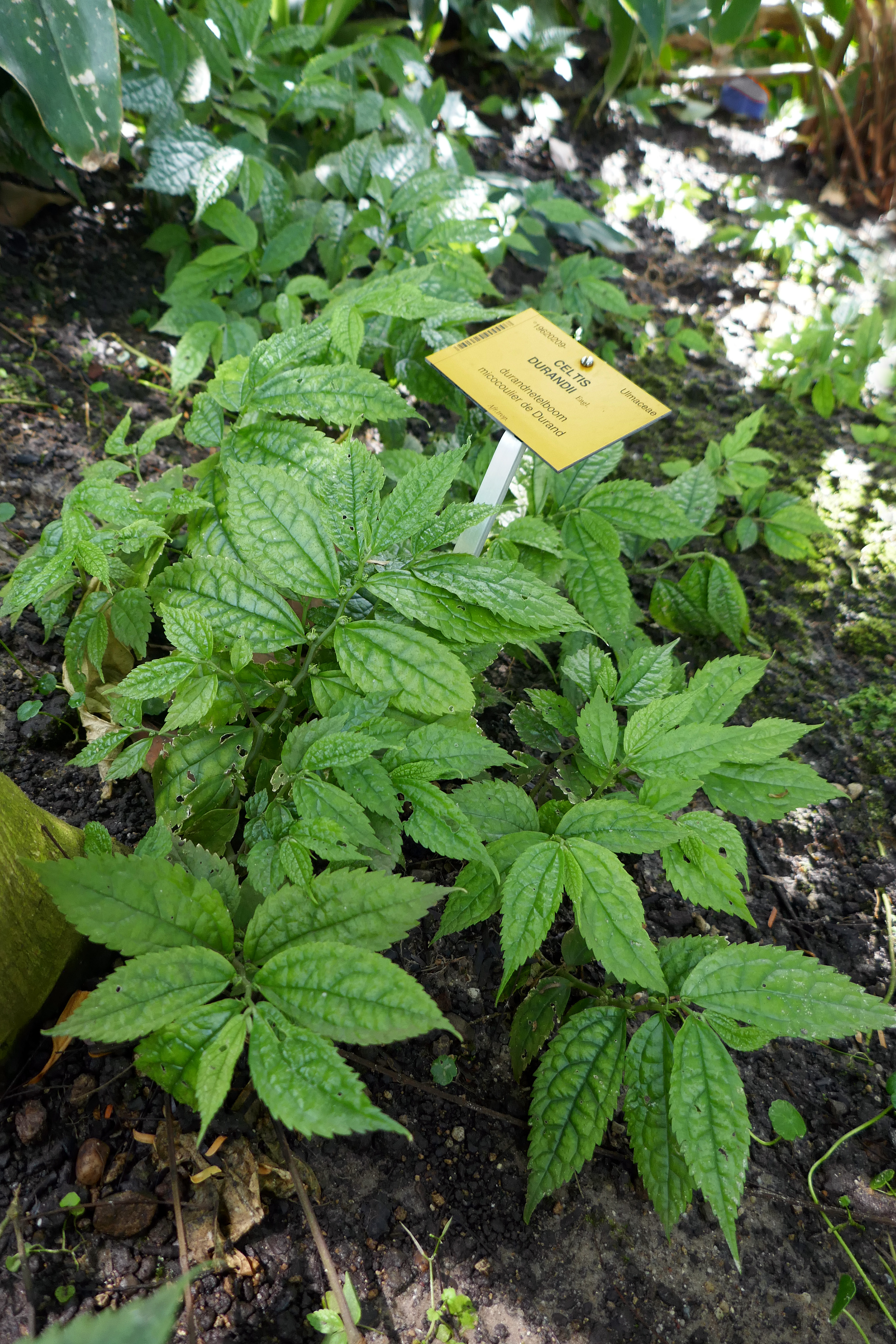

Conservation status
- Least Concern (IUCN 3.1)

Scientific classification
- Kingdom: Plantae
- Clade: Tracheophytes
- Clade: Angiosperms
- Clade: Eudicots
- Clade: Rosids
- Order: Rosales
- Family: Cannabaceae
- Genus: Celtis
- Species: C. gomphophylla

Binomial name
- Celtis gomphophylla Baker

Synonyms
- Celtis dioica S.Moore; Celtis durandii Engl.; Celtis durandii var. ugandensis (Rendle) Rendle; Celtis ugandensis Rendle; Trema integrifolium Baill.

= Celtis gomphophylla =

Species of plant

Celtis gomphophylla is a species of flowering plant native to sub-Saharan Africa, Madagascar, and the Comoros.

== Description ==
Celtis gomphophylla is a tree, growing from 5 to 35 meters tall.

== Range and habitat ==
Celtis gomphophylla ranges across western, central, eastern, and southern Africa south of the Sahara, from Liberia in the west to Ethiopia in the east, and south to Angola and South Africa. The species' estimated extent of occurrence (EOO) is 15,555,354 km^{2}.

It grows in humid tropical lowland and montane forests, dry forests, thickets, and wooded grassland, from 20 to 1500 meters elevation.

== Conservation ==
The tree is widespread across a large range, but is threatened with habitat loss from logging, conversion to agriculture, and human-caused fires, and is over-exploited for timber in parts of its range.
