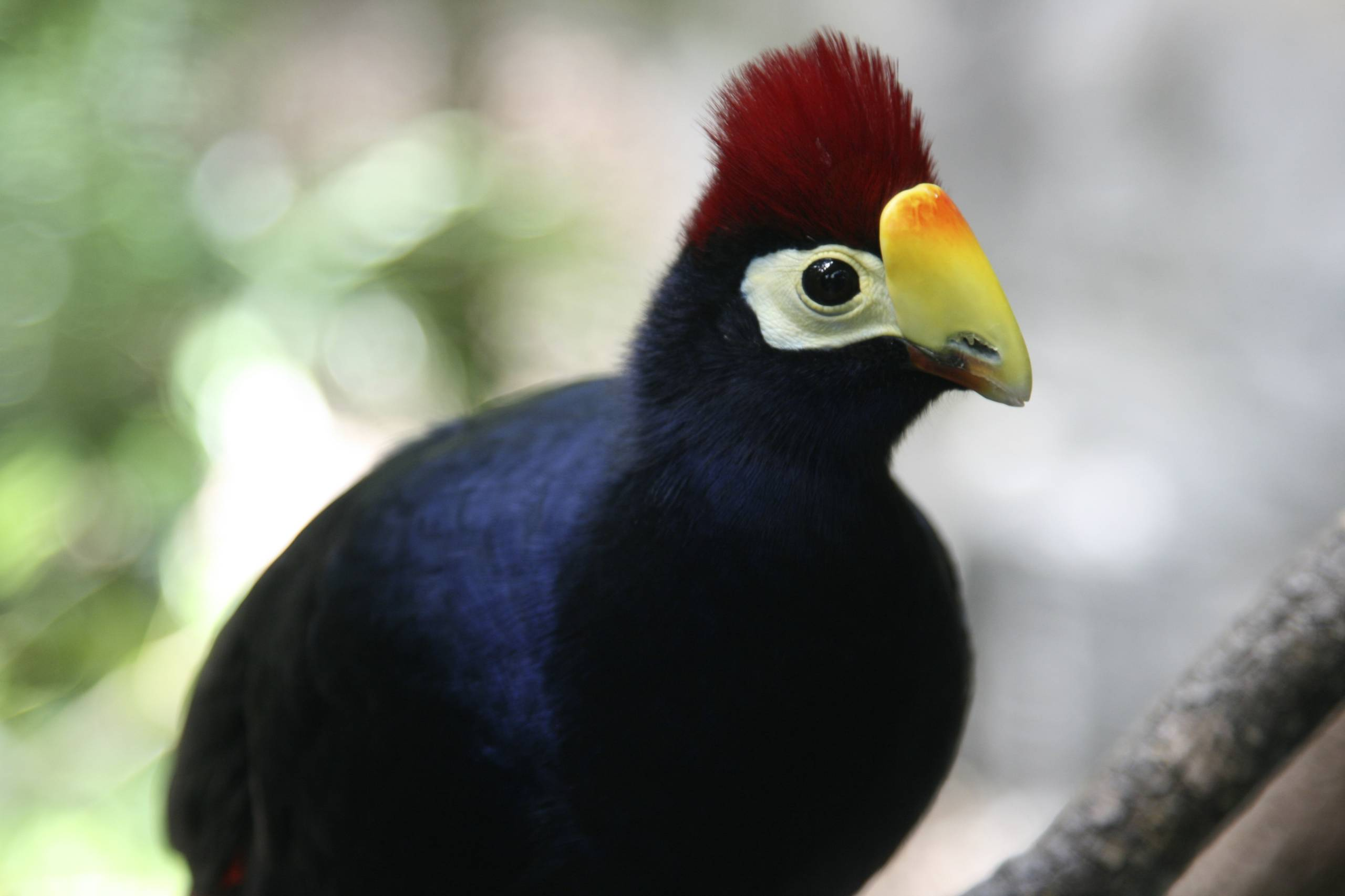
- At Houston Zoo, Texas

Conservation status
- Least Concern (IUCN 3.1)

Scientific classification
- Kingdom: Animalia
- Phylum: Chordata
- Class: Aves
- Order: Musophagiformes
- Family: Musophagidae
- Genus: Tauraco
- Species: T. rossae

Binomial name
- Tauraco rossae (Gould, 1852)
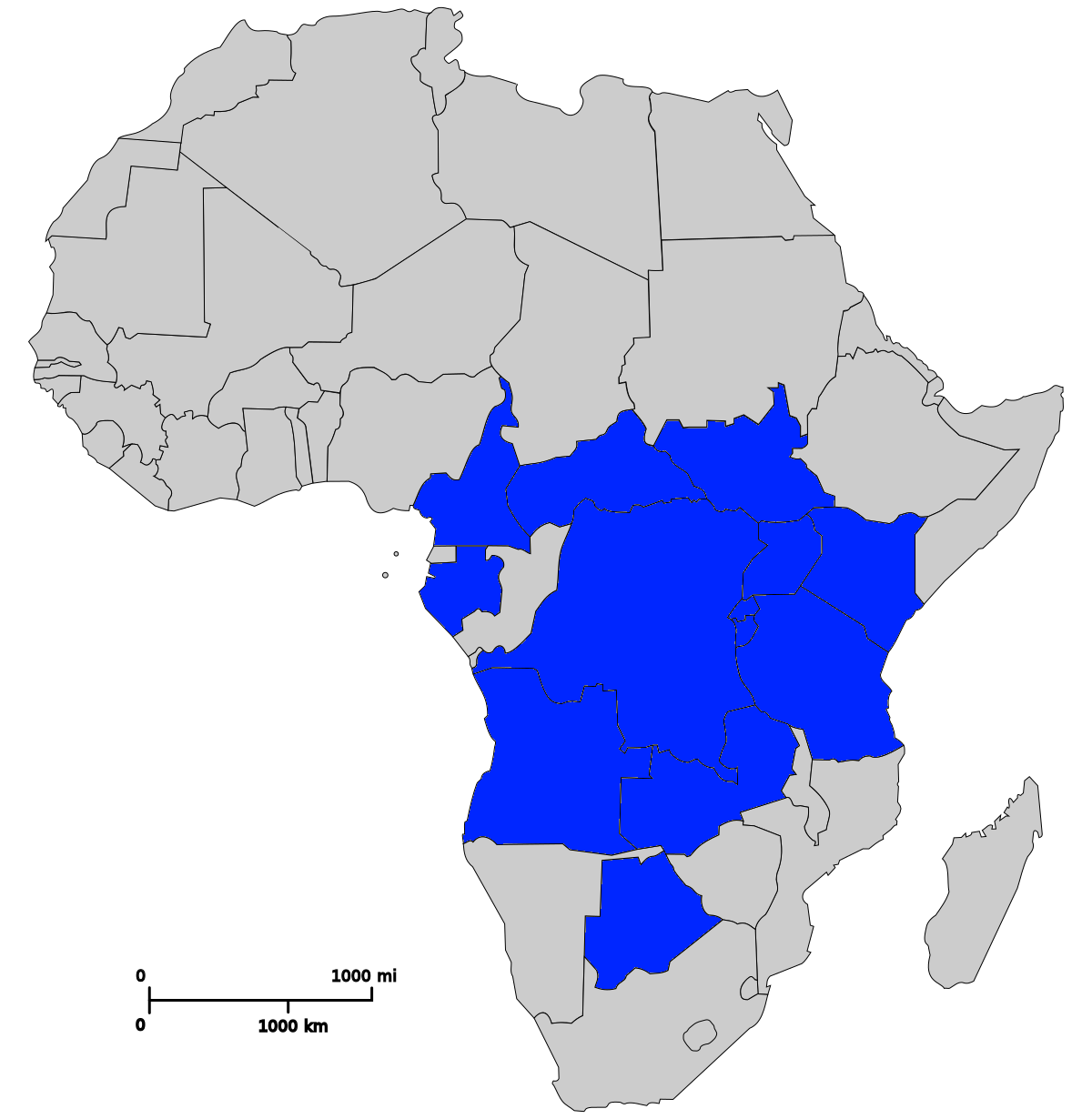

Synonyms
- Musophaga rossae

= Ross's turaco =

Species of bird

Ross's turaco or Lady Ross's turaco (Tauraco rossae) is a mainly bluish-purple African bird of the turaco family, Musophagidae.

== Characteristics ==
This species expresses very little sexual dimorphism, with both males and females being the same deep shade of blue with red head crowns and flight feathers. Females can have slightly more yellow-green beaks while males always have a bright yellow, with both having a forehead shield that flares to a medium orange. Their wings are round and short, best for short bursts of powered flight. They have black legs with three forward facing toes; with a fourth toe being semi-zygodactylous, which makes them nimble canopy dwellers. Size can vary from 15 to 18 inches and weigh just under one pound. They are considered very sturdy birds that can live anywhere from 8 to 20 years. Sources on life spans tend to vary.

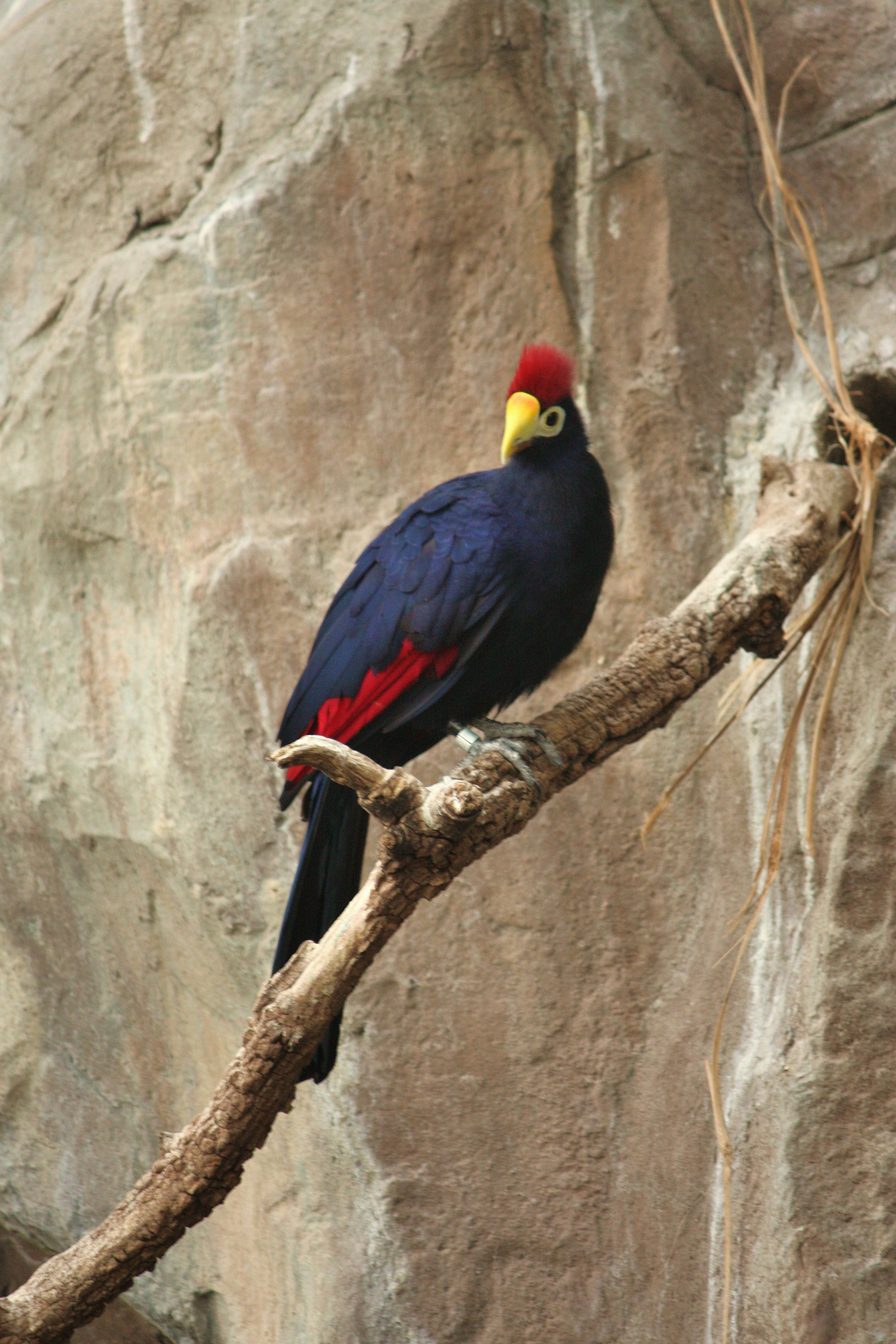
Ross's turaco at Denver Zoo

== Habitat ==
This bird is mostly found in woodlands, open forest and riparian habitats in Angola, Botswana, Burundi, Cameroon, Central African Republic, Democratic Republic of the Congo, Gabon, Kenya, Rwanda, South Sudan, Tanzania, Uganda, and Zambia. They generally avoid heavily forested areas and their numbers remain strong despite the threat of habitat destruction due to agriculture expansion. These birds are non-migrating and rarely travel far from their birthplace, but will travel if food is not abundant in their immediate area.

== Diet ==
These birds are largely frugivorous, consuming mostly the fruits, flowers, and seeds of both wild and cultivated plants. They are known for being one of the biggest seed spreaders in the region. They will also eat small insects like termites and snails; especially around brooding season. Their family name (Musophagidae) actually means "plantain eater" which is a misnomer, because they rarely gravitate to banana or plantain trees. They actually prefer figs over most things. Due to their opportunistic feeding style, they are considered pests in most areas because they can easily destroy crops and gardens.

== Reproduction ==
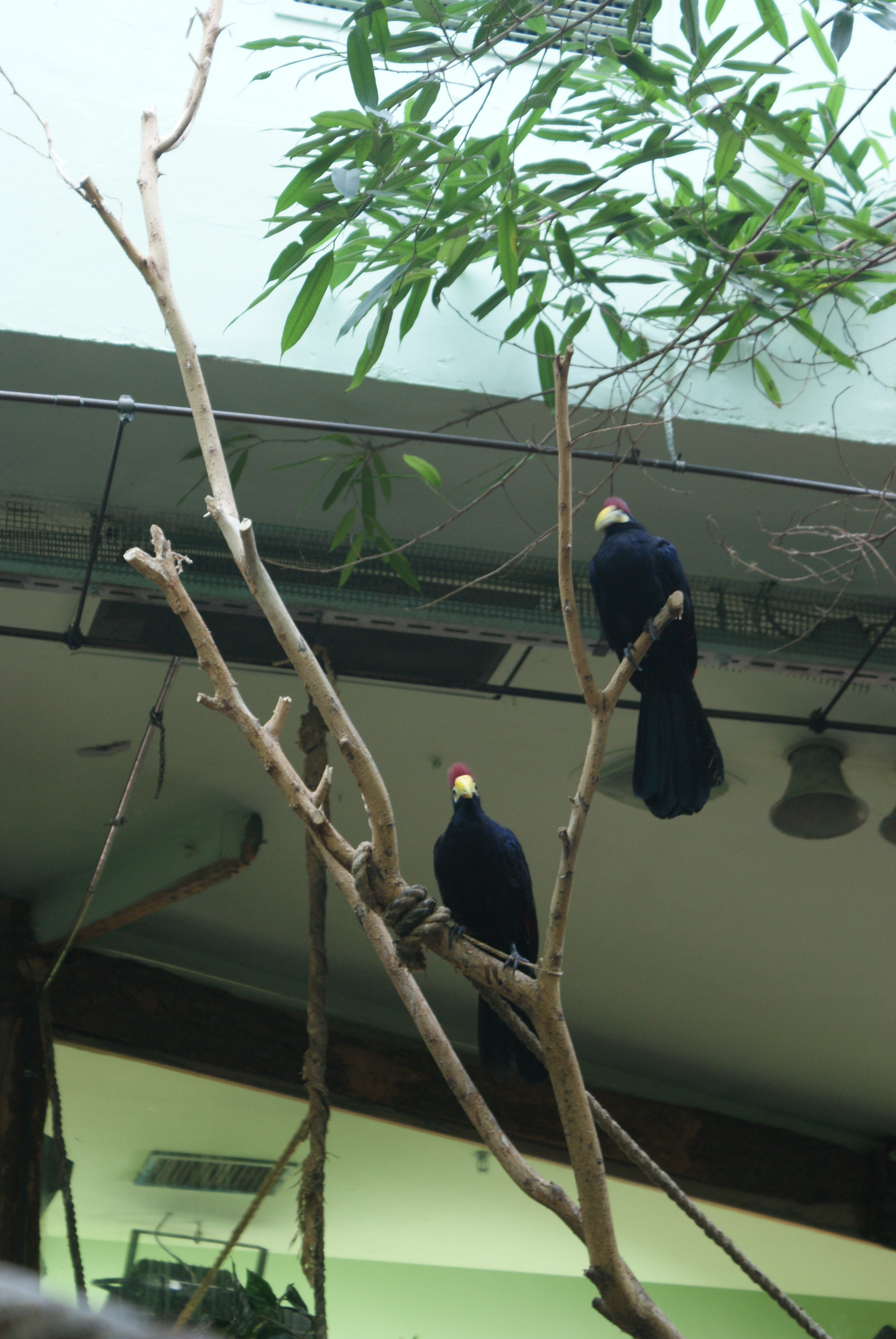
A pair in Tropicarium-Oceanarium, Budapest

Ross's turaco form monogamous breeding pairs that share incubation and feeding duties. They lay 2 to 3 eggs which hatch after roughly 25 days. They then spend another 4 to 7 weeks nesting with their parents before they fledge. Strangely, they become mostly independent before they can fly, opting to climb about in the canopy of the forest. They reach sexual maturity after one year of age and remain near their parents in extended family flocks of up to thirty individuals. Flock members often assist in raising other flock members' chicks, especially when the female is a first time mother. These birds are known to become more territorial around brooding season, especially with predatory or unfamiliar birds.

== Captivity ==
It is quite common in captivity, although not as common as its nearest relative, the violet turaco. Zoo diets often consist of "oranges, apples, mangoes, pears, papayas, bananas, and softbill diet pellets." These birds do quite well in captivity as they prefer climbing over flight, thus requiring less aviary space. They are hardy birds and breed quite readily, living more extended lives compared to their wild counterparts. They are occasionally kept as pets. Ross's turaco are internationally found in zoos and botanical gardens, popular with visitors and keepers alike, due to their vivid colors, hardiness and calm disposition.
