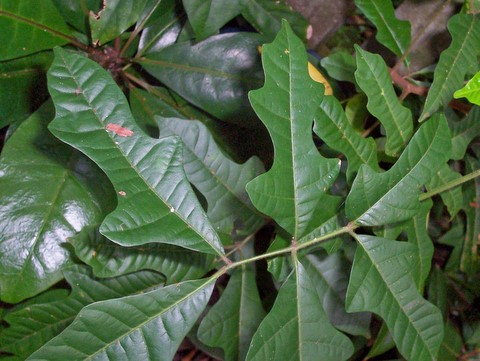
- Lobed juvenile foliage of Deep Yellow Wood

Scientific classification
- Kingdom: Plantae
- Clade: Embryophytes
- Clade: Tracheophytes
- Clade: Spermatophytes
- Clade: Angiosperms
- Clade: Eudicots
- Clade: Rosids
- Order: Sapindales
- Family: Anacardiaceae
- Genus: Rhodosphaera; Engl.
- Species: R. rhodanthema

Binomial name
- Rhodosphaera rhodanthema (F.Muell.) Engl.

= Rhodosphaera =

Genus of trees

Rhodosphaera is a genus of plants in the family Anacardiaceae. The genus includes a single species, Rhodosphaera rhodanthema, which is a rainforest tree of eastern Australia. It grows in sub tropical rainforests and also in the drier form of rainforests. The natural range of distribution is from the Macleay River, New South Wales to Maryborough in south east Queensland. Common names include deep yellowwood, yellow cedar and tulip satinwood.

== Description ==
A medium-sized tree growing to around 25 metres tall and a trunk diameter of 75 cm. The trunk is cylindrical with buttressing at the base. The bark is scaly dark brown.

Leaves are lobed when coppicing or juvenile, somewhat resembling an oak leaf. Mature leaves are pinnate and alternate with six to twelve leaflets, 4 to 7 cm long and 1 to 2 cm broad. More or less opposite each other on the stem, not equal at the leaf base. Leaf shape is elliptic to elliptic lanceolate with a blunt tip. Sometimes with minor leaf serrations, otherwise entire. The leaf's midrib is raised on both surfaces.

Red flowers form in panicles in the months of September to October. Male and female flowers are sometimes on different trees.

The fruit is a shiny dark brown drupe, 1 cm in diameter. Inside the fruit is one flat seed, around 9 mm long. The fruit is ripe from February to June.

Regeneration is fairly slow but reliable. Scraping or filing the seed is advised to assist seed germination.

== Uses ==
The yellow timber is well regarded, being fine grained and attractively figured. Also Rhodosphaera rhodanthema is an appealing park tree.

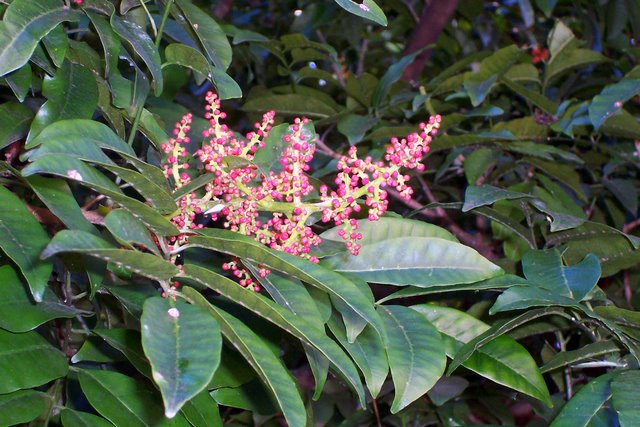
Rhodosphaera rhodanthema - leaves and flower panicle

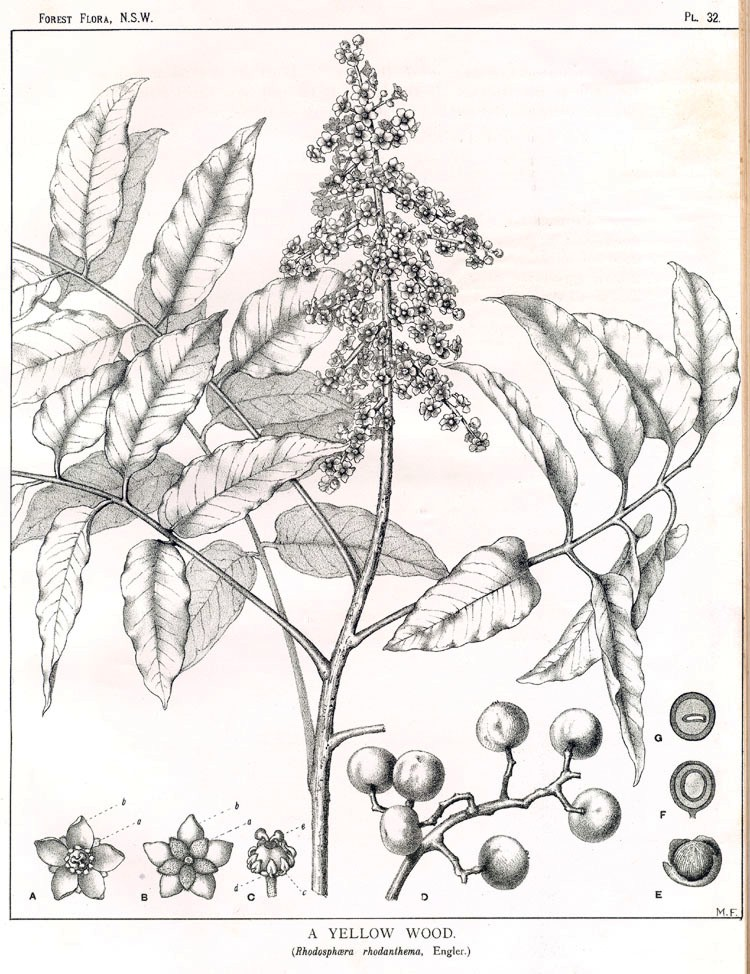
drawing by Margaret Flockton
