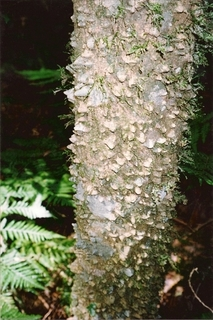
- Trunk at Tooloom National Park

Scientific classification
- Kingdom: Plantae
- Clade: Tracheophytes
- Clade: Angiosperms
- Clade: Eudicots
- Clade: Rosids
- Order: Sapindales
- Family: Rutaceae
- Genus: Zanthoxylum
- Species: Z. brachyacanthum

Binomial name
- Zanthoxylum brachyacanthum F.Muell.

Synonyms
- Fagara brachyacantha (F.Muell.) Engl.; Fagara brachyacanthum Engl. orth. var.; Fagara venefica (F.M.Bailey) Engl.; Fagara venenifica Engl. orth. var.; Xanthoxylon brachyacanthum F.Muell. orth. var.; Xanthoxylum brachyacanthum F.Muell. orth. var.; Zanthoxylum veneficum F.M.Bailey

= Zanthoxylum brachyacanthum =

Thorny yellow-wood

Species of tree

Zanthoxylum brachyacanthum, known as thorny yellow-wood, satinwood, satin tree or scrub mulga, is a species of flowering plant in the family Rutaceae and is endemic to north-eastern Australia. It is a rainforest shrub or tree with thick, cone-shaped spines on the trunk and prickles on the branches, pinnate leaves, and male and female flowers arranged in panicles.

== Description ==
Zanthoxylum brachyacanthum is a shrub or tree that typically grows to a height of 25 m (82 ft) usually with prickles on the branches and thick, cone-shaped spines on the trunk and older branches. The leaves are pinnate, arranged alternately, with seven to thirteen leaflets, and 120–300 mm (4.7–11.8 in) long. The leaflets are egg-shaped to elliptic, 40–150 mm (1.6–5.9 in) long and 15–55 mm (0.59–2.17 in) wide, the side leaflets on a petiolule 30–90 mm (1.2–3.5 in) long and the end leaflet on a petiolule 30–180 mm (1.2–7.1 in) long.

The flowers are arranged in panicles on the ends of branches, or in leaf axils or both and 15–25 mm (0.59–0.98 in) long. The flowers are sessile or on pedicels up to 2.5 mm (0.098 in) long, the four sepals joined at the base and about 1 mm (0.039 in) long, the four petals greenish cream-coloured and 4–5 mm (0.16–0.20 in) long. Male flower have four stamens 3.5–8 mm (0.14–0.31 in) long with anthers about 3 mm (0.12 in) long. Females flowers have a single carpel about 3 mm (0.12 in) long with a short style, sometimes with rudimentary stamens. Flowering occurs from September to November and the fruit is a shiny bright red, later wrinkled dark brown, spherical or oval follicle 7–8 mm (0.28–0.31 in) long containing a single black seed.

== Taxonomy ==
Zanthoxylum brachyacanthum was first formally described in 1857 by Ferdinand von Mueller in Transactions of the Philosophical Institute of Victoria from specimens collected in "the Araucaria forests of Moreton Bay".

Zanthoxylum veneficum, listed as a synonym of Z. brachyacanthum by the Australian Plant Census, is recognised as a different species in Queensland.

== Distribution and habitat ==
This tree grows on a variety of subtropical, tropical and drier rainforests, often on volcanic soils. Young trees are easily identified in the rainforest by the thorny trunk. The natural range is from the Clarence River (29° S) in New South Wales to tropical Queensland in the Eungella National Park and the Wet Tropics region.

== Ecology ==
The leaves of Zanthoxylum brachyacanthum serve as a food plant for butterfly larvae including those of the orchard swallowtail butterfly, the fuscus swallowtail and Papilio polyctor.

== Uses ==
This tree's small size, the interesting trunk, the attractive flowers and foliage makes the thorny yellowwood a candidate ornamental plant. The timber is deep yellow and close grained, and thus it might be suitable for decorative work.

The plant family contains some interesting alkaloids, coumarins, furanocoumarins, and pyranocoumarins, acetophenones such as Zantholoxylin, flavanoids like amurensin, and polyhydroxol flavanoids, and Amides.

The essential (leaf) oil of Z. brachyacanthum was rich in α-pinene (46%), β-caryophyllene (14%) and bicyclogermacrene (12.5%).

== Gallery ==
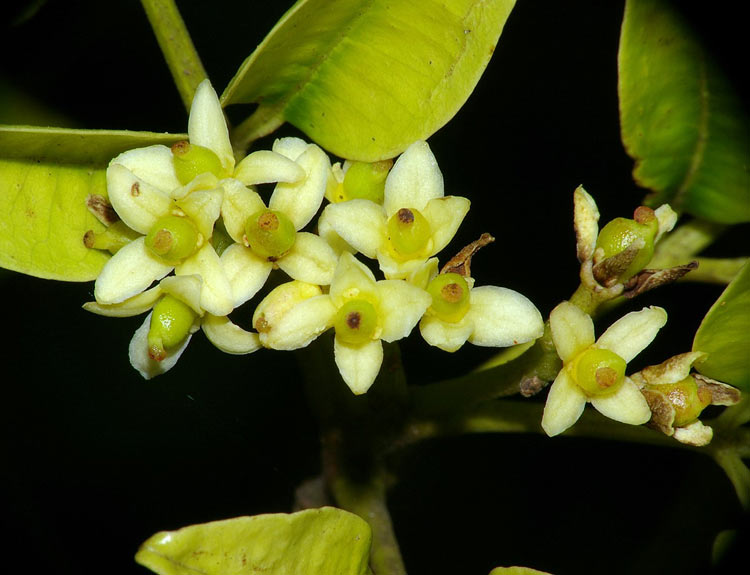
Female flowers

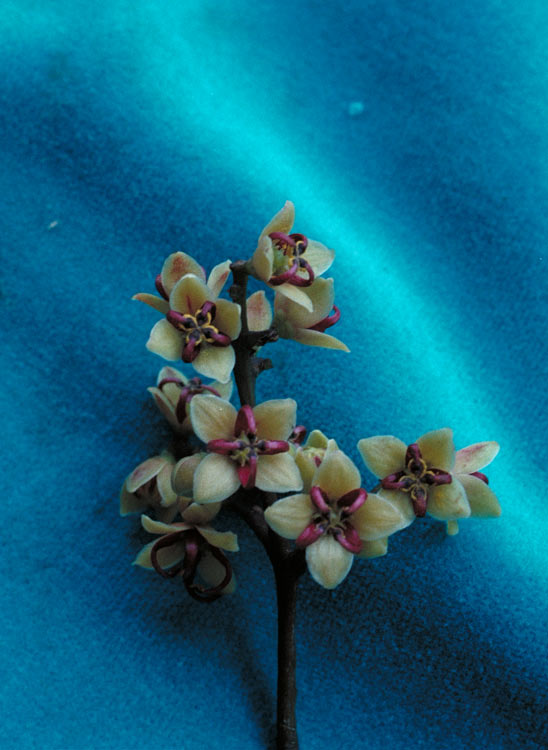
Male flowers

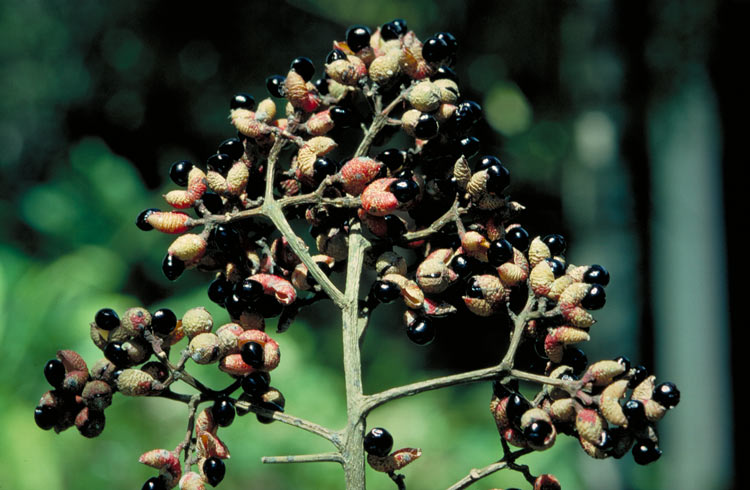
Fruit
