= Afrocarpus dawei =

Conservation status
- Near Threatened (IUCN 3.1)

Scientific classification
- Kingdom: Plantae
- Clade: Tracheophytes
- Clade: Gymnosperms
- Division: Pinophyta
- Class: Pinopsida
- Order: Araucariales
- Family: Podocarpaceae
- Genus: Afrocarpus
- Species: A. dawei

Binomial name
- Afrocarpus dawei (Stapf) C.N.Page

Synonyms
- Podocarpus dawei Stapf 1917; Podocarpus usumbarensis Pilg. var. dawei (Stapf) Melv. 1954

Species of conifer

Afrocarpus dawei is a species of coniferous tree in the family Podocarpaceae. It is native to Africa, where it occurs in the Democratic Republic of the Congo, Tanzania, and Uganda.

This species is a tree that grows in swampy forest habitat that is flooded in the rainy season. It is associated with Baikiaea insignis and Mimusops species.

A. dawei is found in the Minziro Forest of Tanzania and the adjacent Sango Bay forests of Uganda, located west of Lake Victoria. The Kagera River sustains swamp forests and a high groundwater table that supports evergreen lowland forests.

This tree is valuable as timber because it grows a long trunk without many branches. It is likely overharvested, one reason that it is considered to be a near-threatened species.
