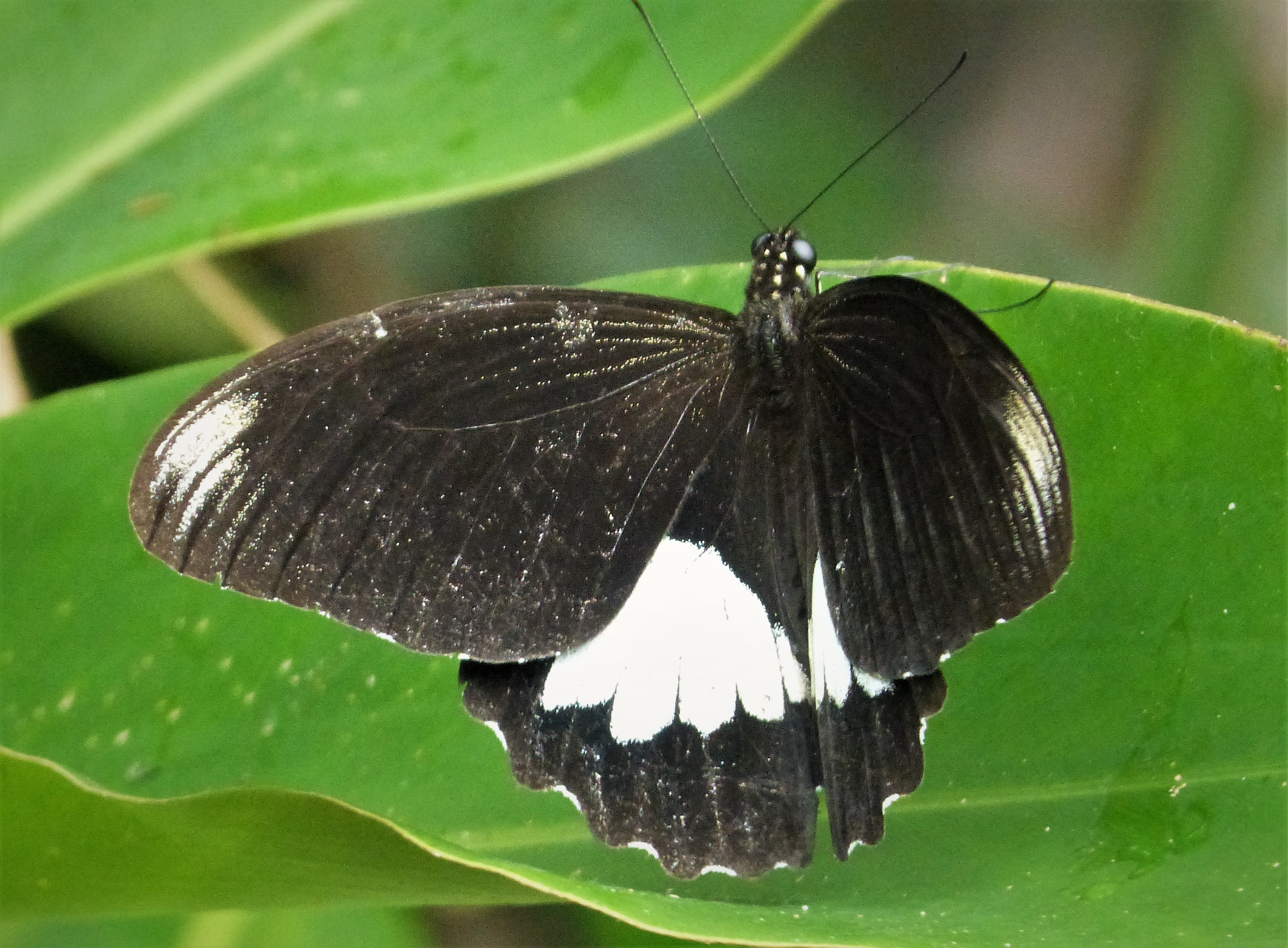

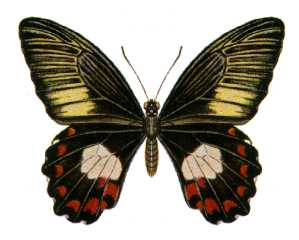

Scientific classification
- Kingdom: Animalia
- Phylum: Arthropoda
- Clade: Pancrustacea
- Class: Insecta
- Order: Lepidoptera
- Family: Papilionidae
- Genus: Papilio
- Species: P. ambrax

Binomial name
- Papilio ambrax Boisduval, 1832

Synonyms
- Papilio orophanes Boisduval, 1836; Menelaides ambrax (Boisduval, 1832); Papilio ambracia Wallace, 1865; Papilio dunali Montrouzier, 1856; Papilio epirus Wallace, 1865; Papilio egipius Miskin, 1876

= Papilio ambrax =

Ambrax butterfly

Species of butterfly

Papilio ambrax, the Ambrax butterfly, is a butterfly of the family Papilionidae. It is found in Queensland, Australia, as well as the Aru Islands, Papua (Indonesia), and Papua New Guinea.

== Description ==
The wingspan is 90–100 mm (3.5–3.9 in).Very nearly allied to P. polytes; both sexes without tail. Male: forewing with thin marginal spots confined to the edge of the wing; hindwing above with large white area, which always enters the cell and is much broader than the black marginal area; beneath this area is entirely absent or is replaced by rounded white-grey shadowy spots. Female on both wings with thin marginal spots, which are smaller than in all the polytes-forms-, no indication of nail-head spots at the black distal margin of the forewing;hindwing beneath as in the male with extremely small yellow-grey scales between the veins in the basal area; the white area of the hindwing similar to that of P. pol. nicanor, but the veins, especially the apex of the cell, even less black. There is no female form similar to the male. The larva when full-grown green, ventrally at the sides a broad stripe, which also covers the prolegs and is above edged with whitish; from this stripe, besides an anal band, branch off 3 bands of the same colour, which are not interrupted above, on the thorax in addition is placed a transverse band, laterally widened into spectacle-shape. The butterfly is very common.Karl Jordan in Seitz.

The larvae feed on Citrus species, Clausena brevistyla, Limonia acidissima, Microcitrus garrawayae, Microcitrus inodora, Murraya koenigii, Zanthoxylum ailanthoides, Zanthoxylum brachyacanthum, Zanthoxylum nitidum, Zanthoxylum ovalifolium, and Morinda citrifolia.

== Subspecies ==
- Papilio ambrax ambrax (western Irian to Papua)
- Papilio ambrax dunali Montrouzier, 1856 (Woodlark Island)
- Papilio ambrax epirus Wallace, 1865 male above with red anal spot, beneath with more than 2 yellow-red spots; the apex of the forewing with faint grey stripes. female:the forewing between the 1. median and the 2. submedian with 2 white patches, of which at least the posterior one is much shorter than its distance from the distal margin. (Aru)
- Papilio ambrax epigius Miskin, 1876 Male forewing with apical patch. The band of the hindwing does not reach the abdominal margin, or the last spot is diffuse; the red anal spot is almost always present also above, beneath all the submarginal spots are commonly developed.Female forewing with white area, the light stripes in the apex of the cell and on the disc purer white than in female-f. ambracia. Hindwing also above with a complete row of red submarginal spots. (north-eastern coast of Queensland)
- Papilio ambrax artanus Rothschild, 1908 male: upper surface of the forewing with weak grey apical stripes; band of the hindwing narrower in the middle than in P. a. ambrax. female forewing with white area as in female-f. ambracia; the 1. discal spot of the hindwing smaller than in that form, oblique, triangular or trapezoidal. (Mefor, Geelvink Bay)

== Taxonomy ==
Papilio ambrax is a member of the polytes species group. The clade members are:

- Papilio polytes Linnaeus, 1758
- Papilio ambrax Boisduval, 1832
- Papilio phestus Guérin-Méneville, 1830
