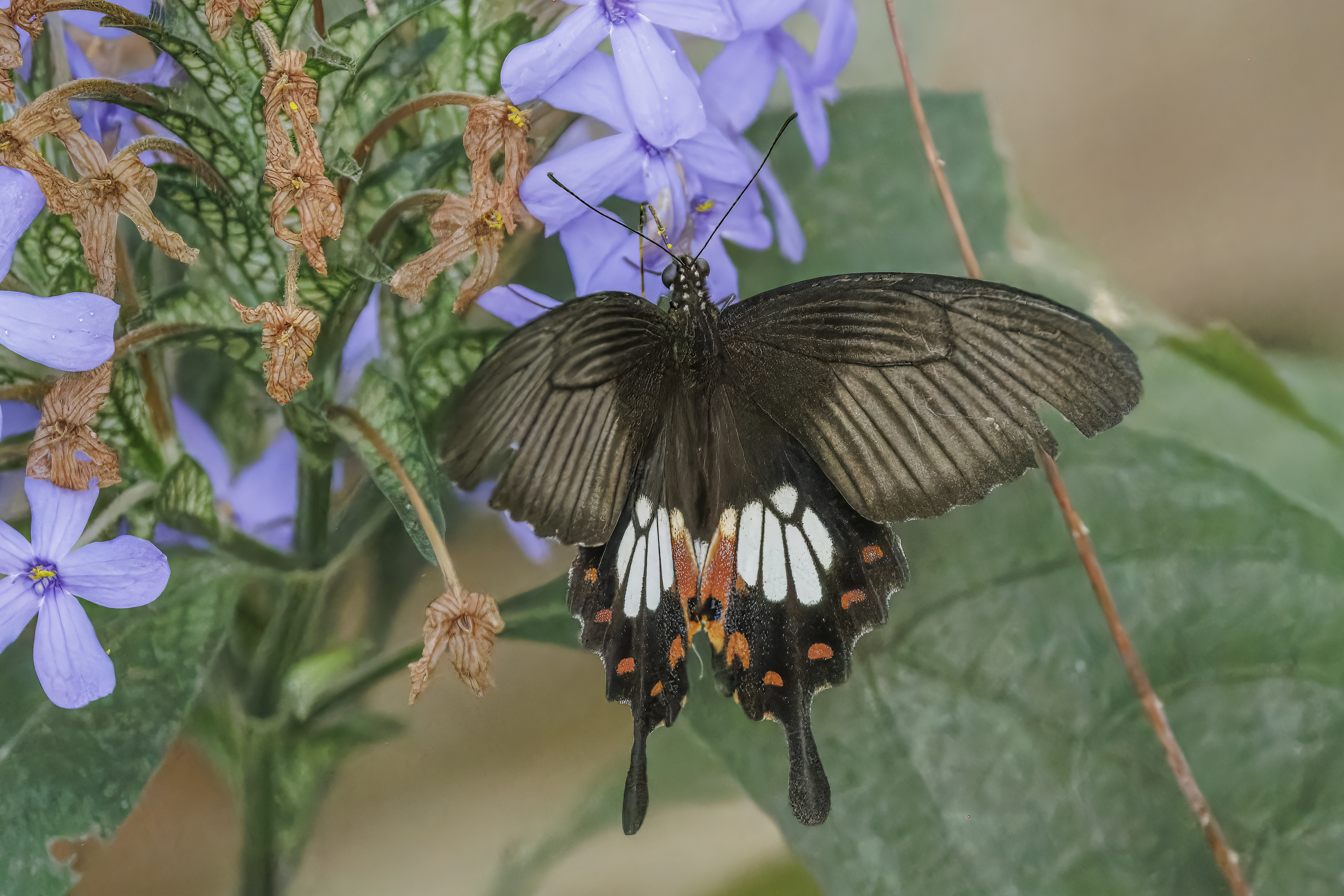
- Papilio polytes romulus in Laos
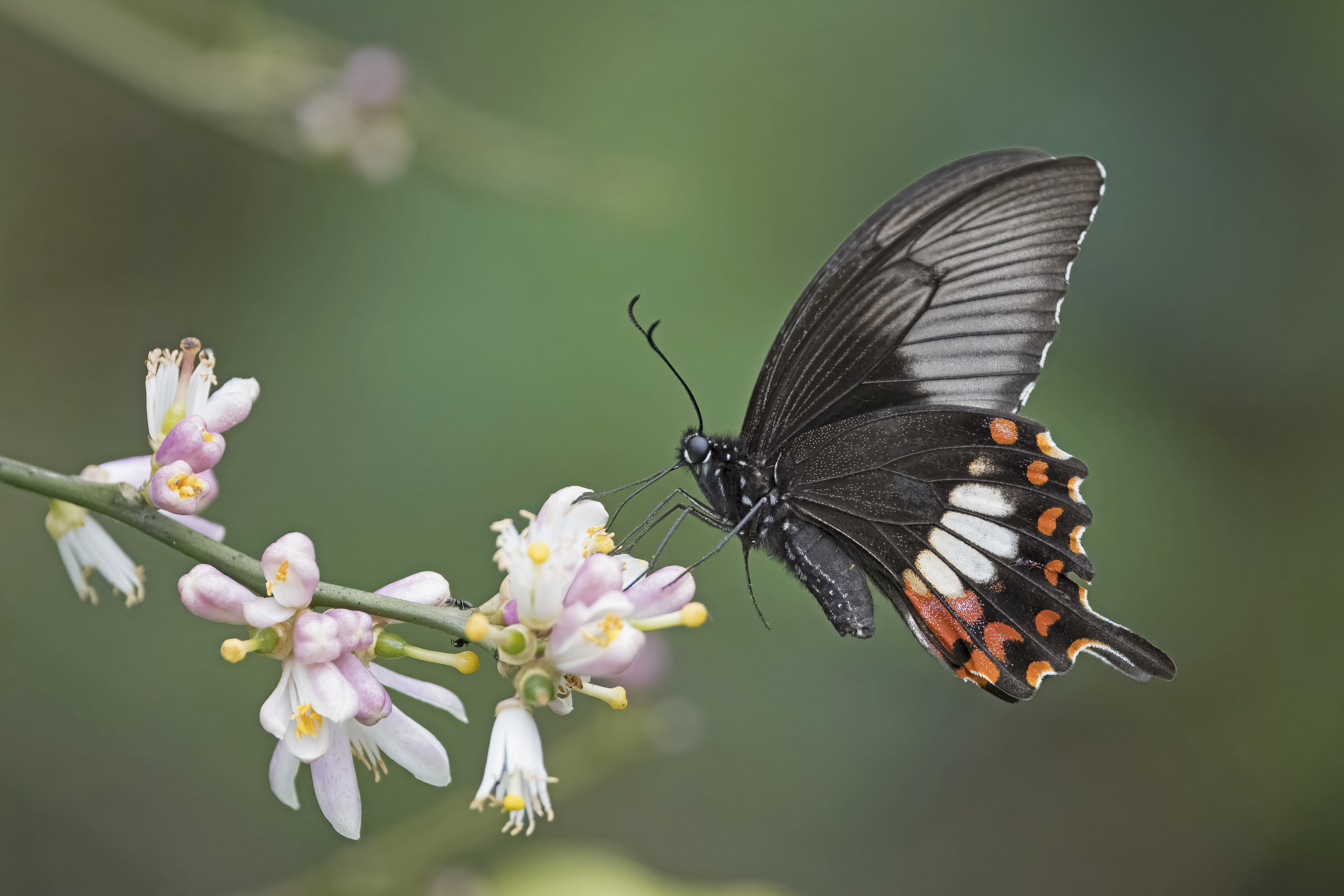
- Papilio polytes pasikrates in Taiwan; Both are females form stichius

Conservation status
- Least Concern (IUCN 3.1)

Scientific classification
- Kingdom: Animalia
- Phylum: Arthropoda
- Clade: Pancrustacea
- Class: Insecta
- Order: Lepidoptera
- Family: Papilionidae
- Genus: Papilio
- Species: P. polytes

Binomial name
- Papilio polytes Linnaeus, 1758

Subspecies
- Many, see text
- Range of P. polytes

= Common Mormon =

Species of butterfly

Papilio polytes, the common mormon, is a common species of swallowtail butterfly widely distributed across Asia.

This butterfly is known for the mimicry displayed by the numerous forms of its females which mimic inedible red-bodied swallowtails, such as the common rose and the crimson rose.

== Names ==
The common name is an allusion to the polygamy formerly practiced by members of the Mormon sect according to Harish Gaonkar, of the Natural History Museum in London:

... the origins of giving common English names to organisms, particularly butterflies for tropical species started in India around the mid 19th century ... The naming of Mormons evolved slowly. I think the first to get such a name was the Common Mormon (Papilio polytes), because it had three different females, a fact that could only have been observed in the field, and this they did in India. The name obviously reflected the ... Mormon sect in America, which as we know, practiced polygamy.

The scientific name is constructed from the Latin word for butterfly, Papilio, and the Greek word for many, poly.

== Range ==
Pakistan, India, Bangladesh, Nepal, Sri Lanka, Maldives, Myanmar, Thailand, Singapore, southern and western China (including Hainan and Guangdong provinces), Taiwan, Hong Kong, Japan (Ryukyu Islands), Vietnam, Laos, Cambodia, Andamans, Nicobars, eastern and Peninsular Malaysia, Brunei, Indonesia (except Moluccas and Irian Jaya), Philippines, and Northern Marianas (Saipan).

== Status ==
Very common. Not threatened.

== Description ==
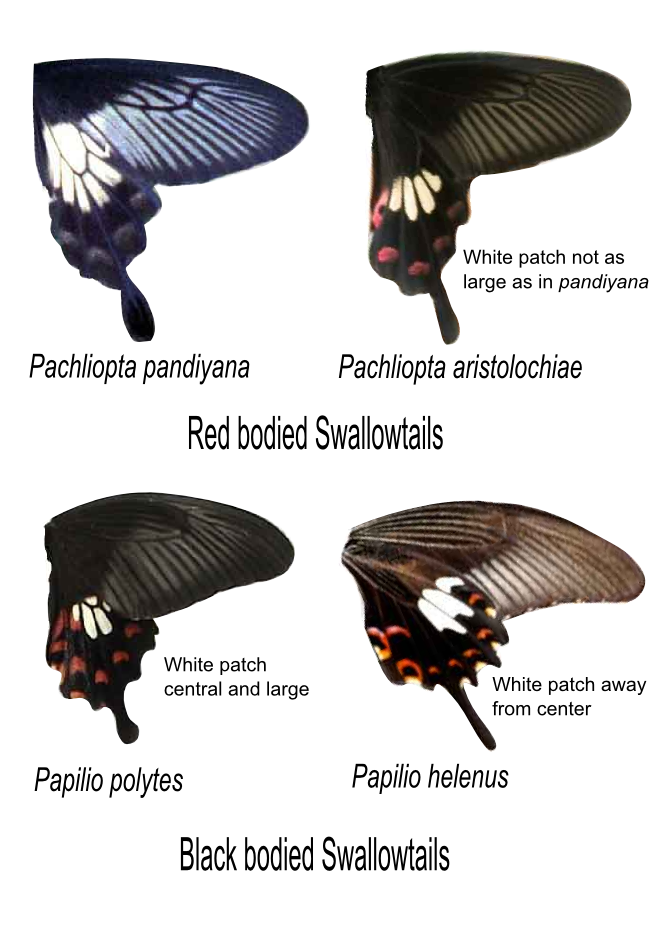
Comparison between similar-looking species: A. pandiyana, A. aristolochiae, P. polytes and P. helenus

Jet black butterfly with row of white spots along the middle part of hindwing. 90–100 millimetres (3.5–3.9 in).

=== Male ===
The male has one morph. It is a dark-coloured swallow-tailed butterfly. The upper forewing has a series of white spots decreasing in size towards the apex. The upper hindwing has a complete discal band of elongated white spots. It may or may not have marginal red crescents. The males are generally smaller in size than the females but not always. Both male and all forms of the female of P. polytes can vary considerably in size depending on climatic region.

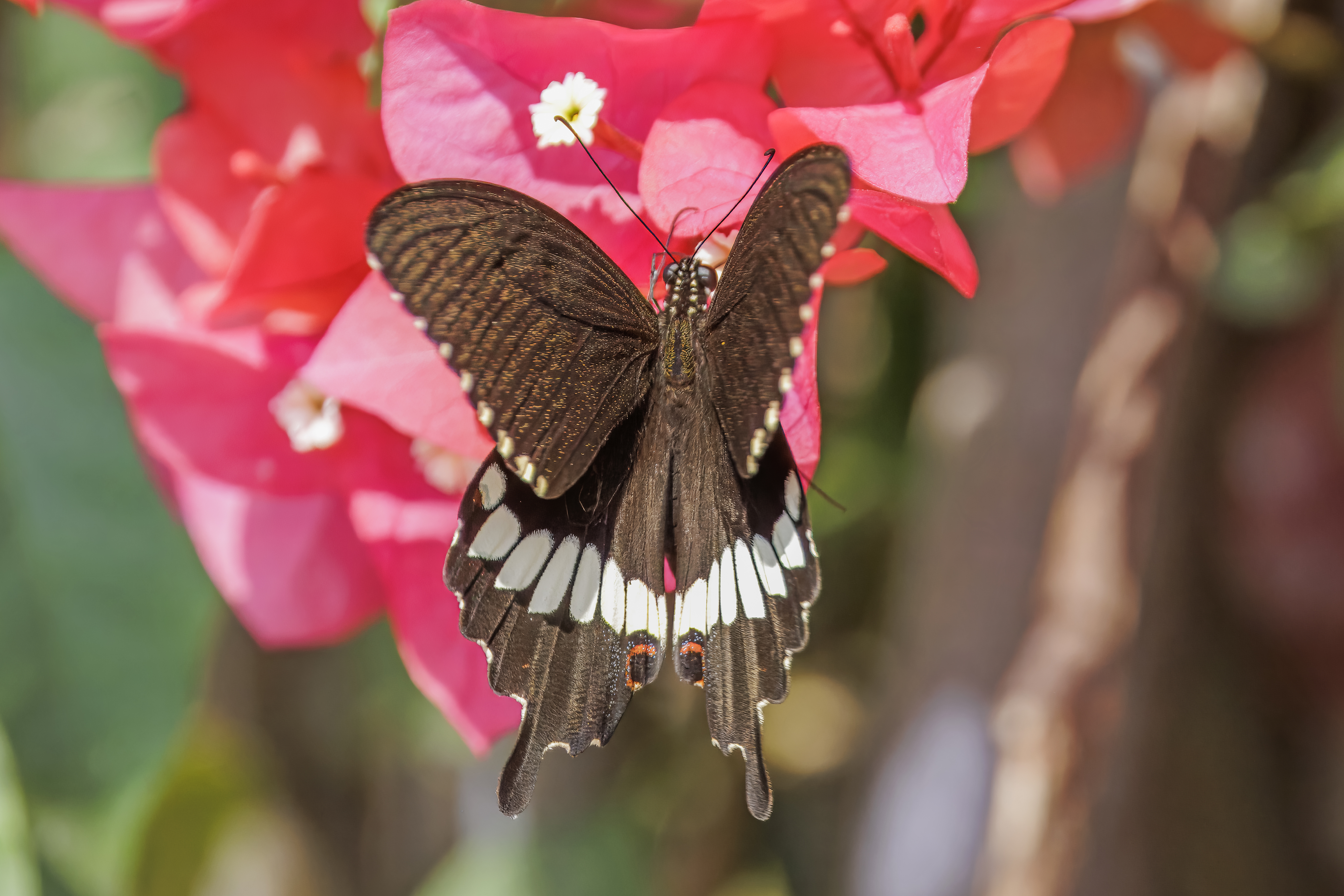
Male form romulus, Laos

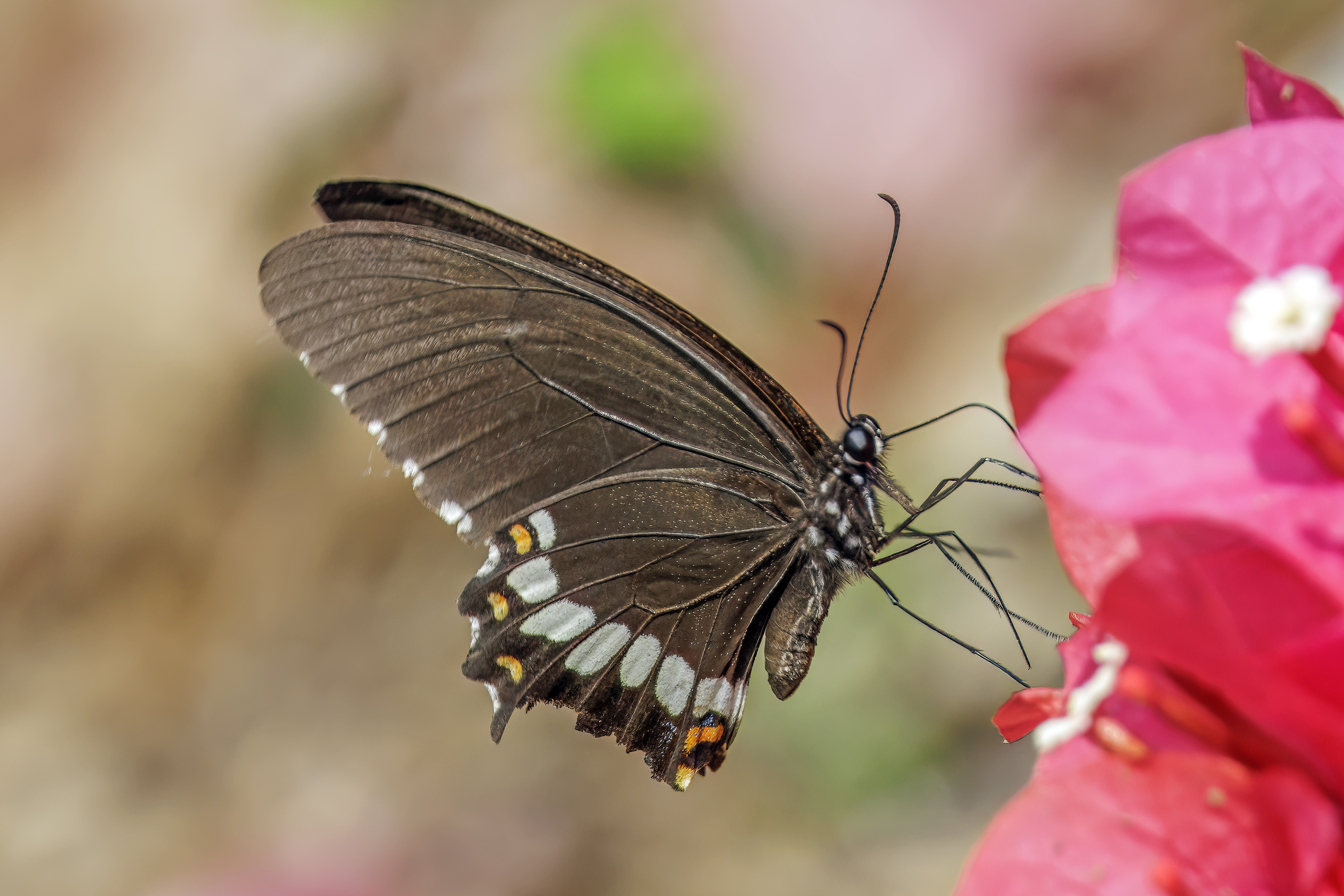
Male form romulus, Laos

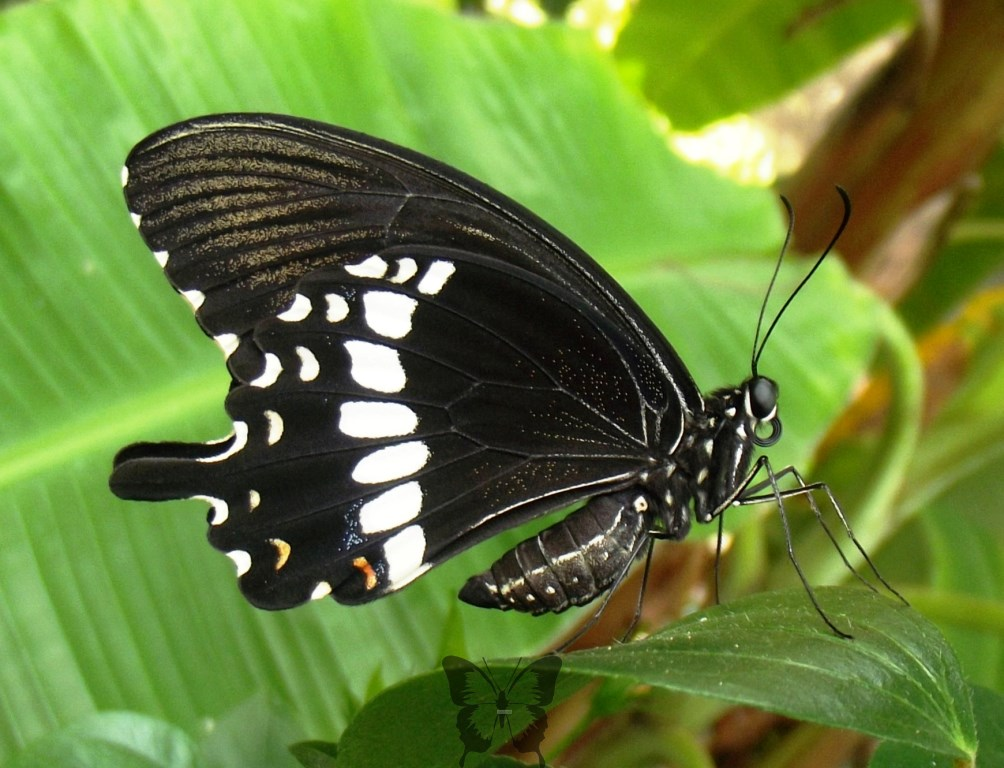
Male, underside

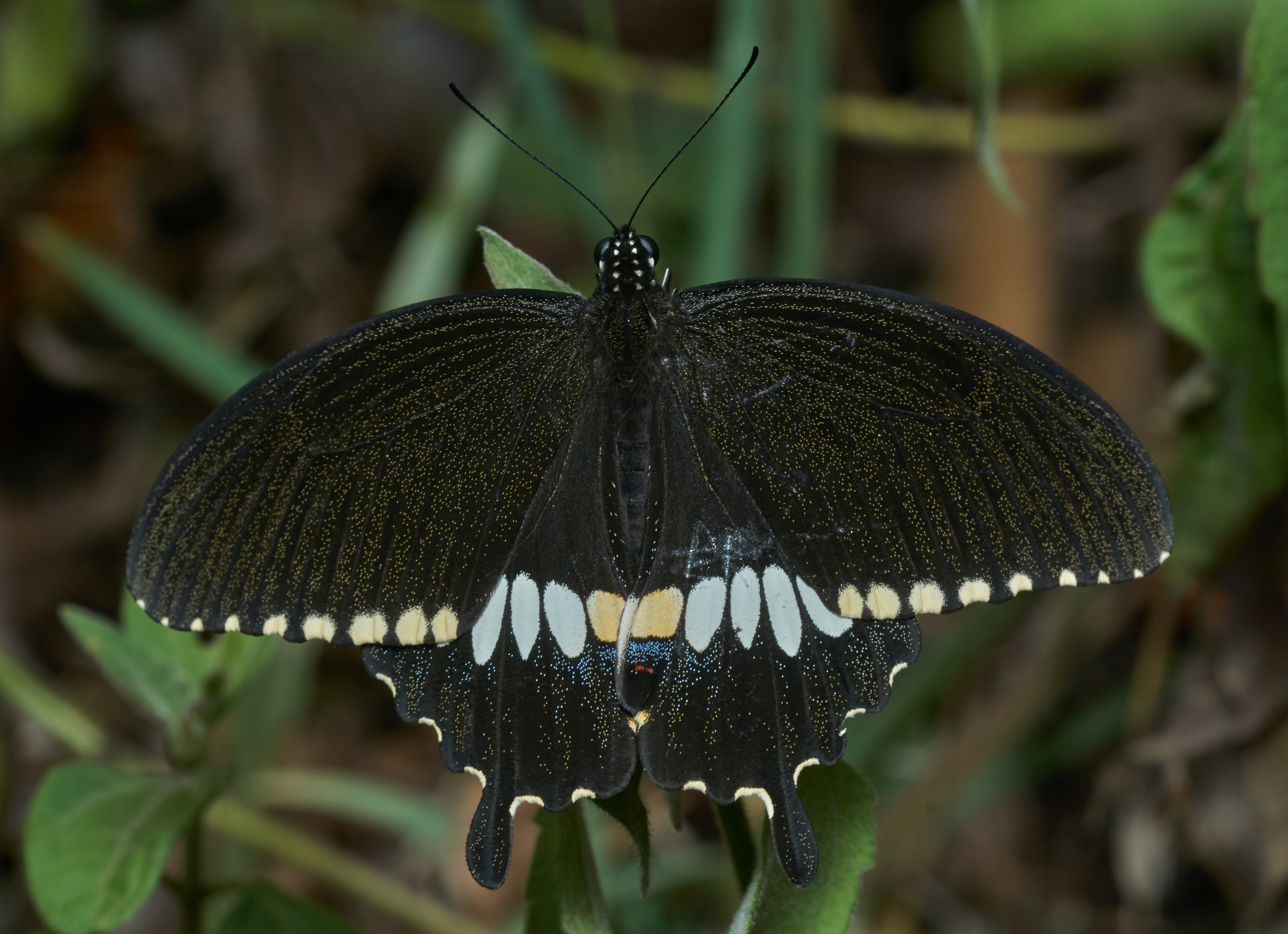
Male, topside

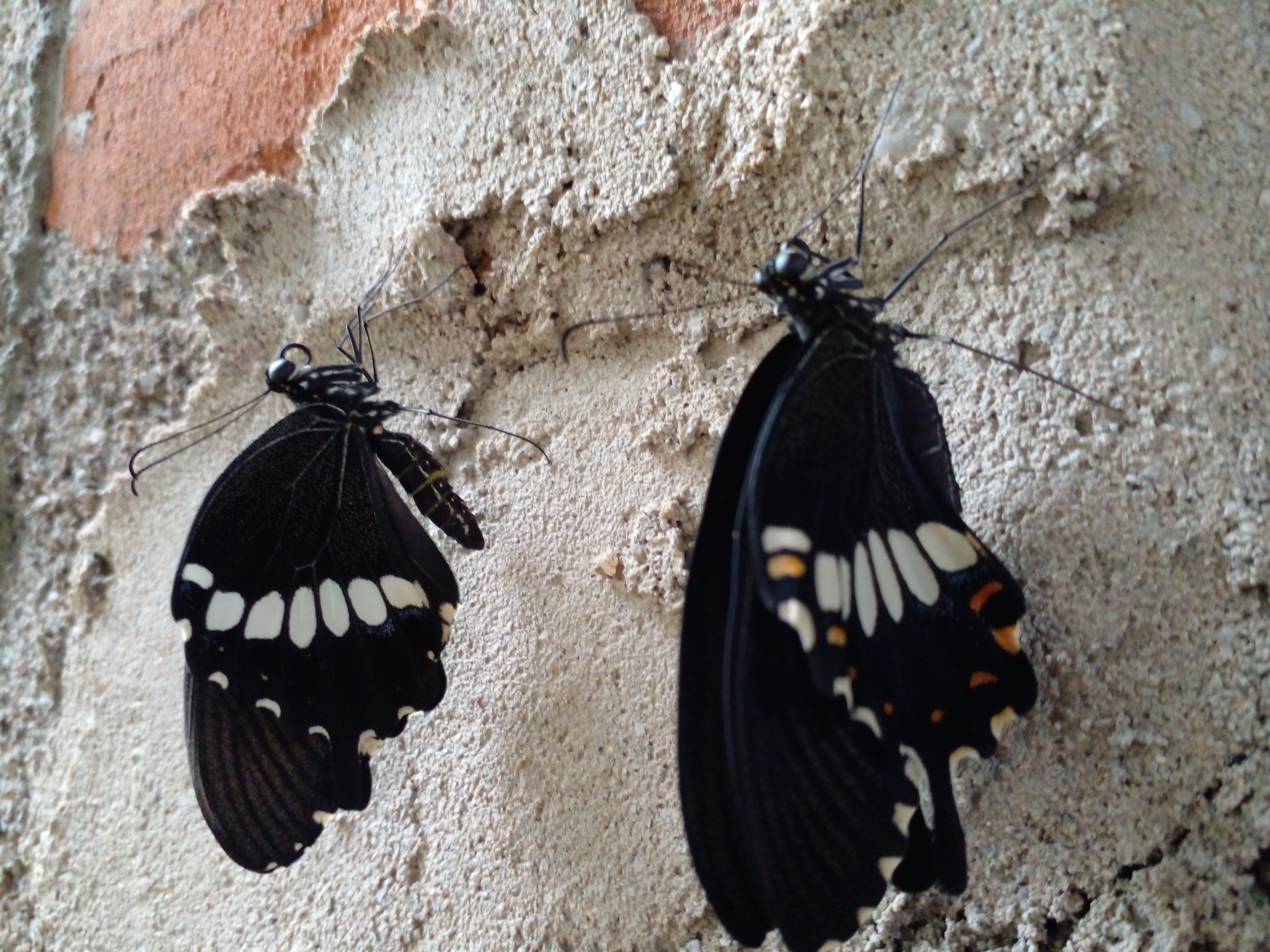
Newly emerged male (left) and female, Sri Lanka

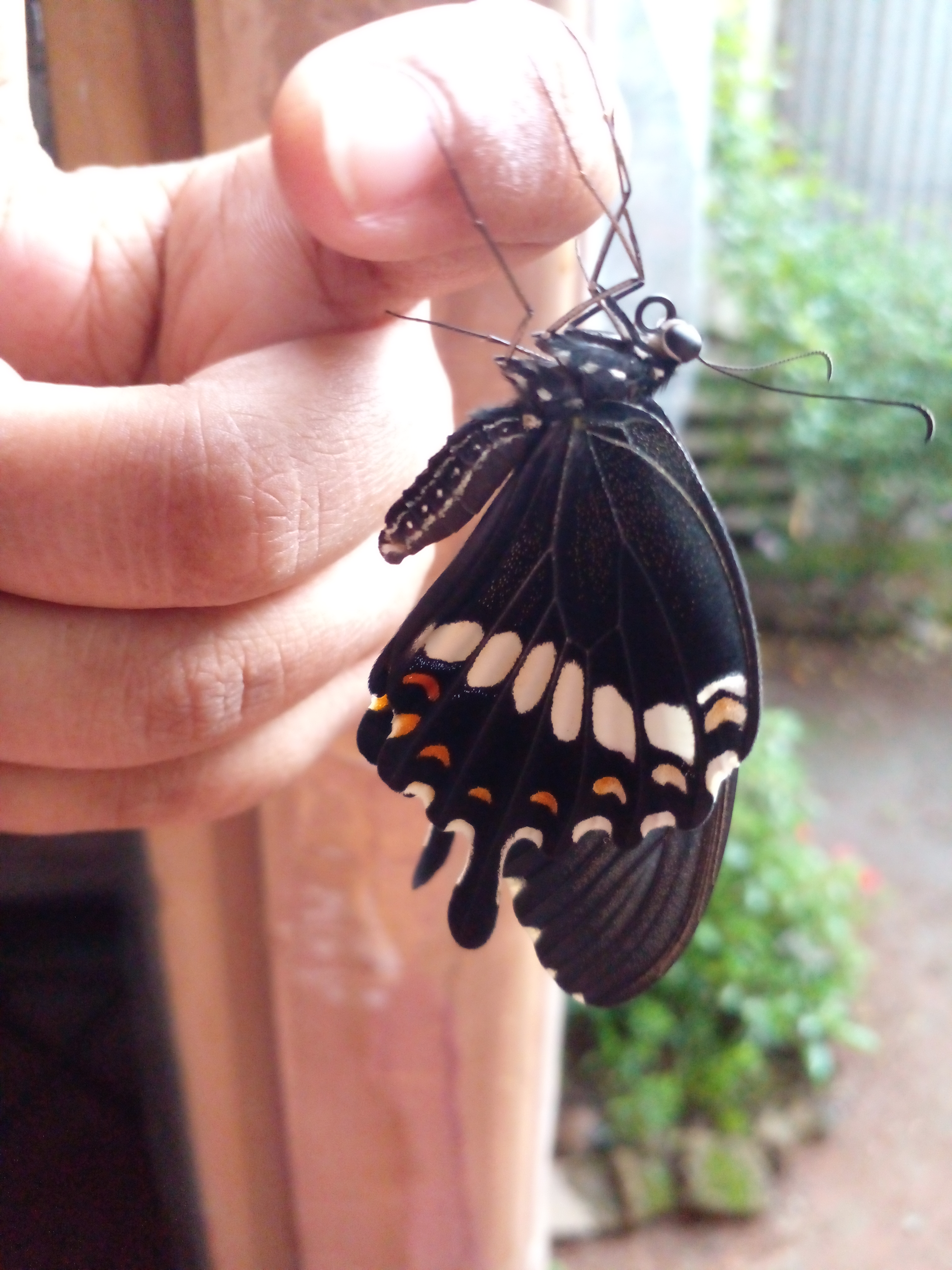
Female, Sri Lanka

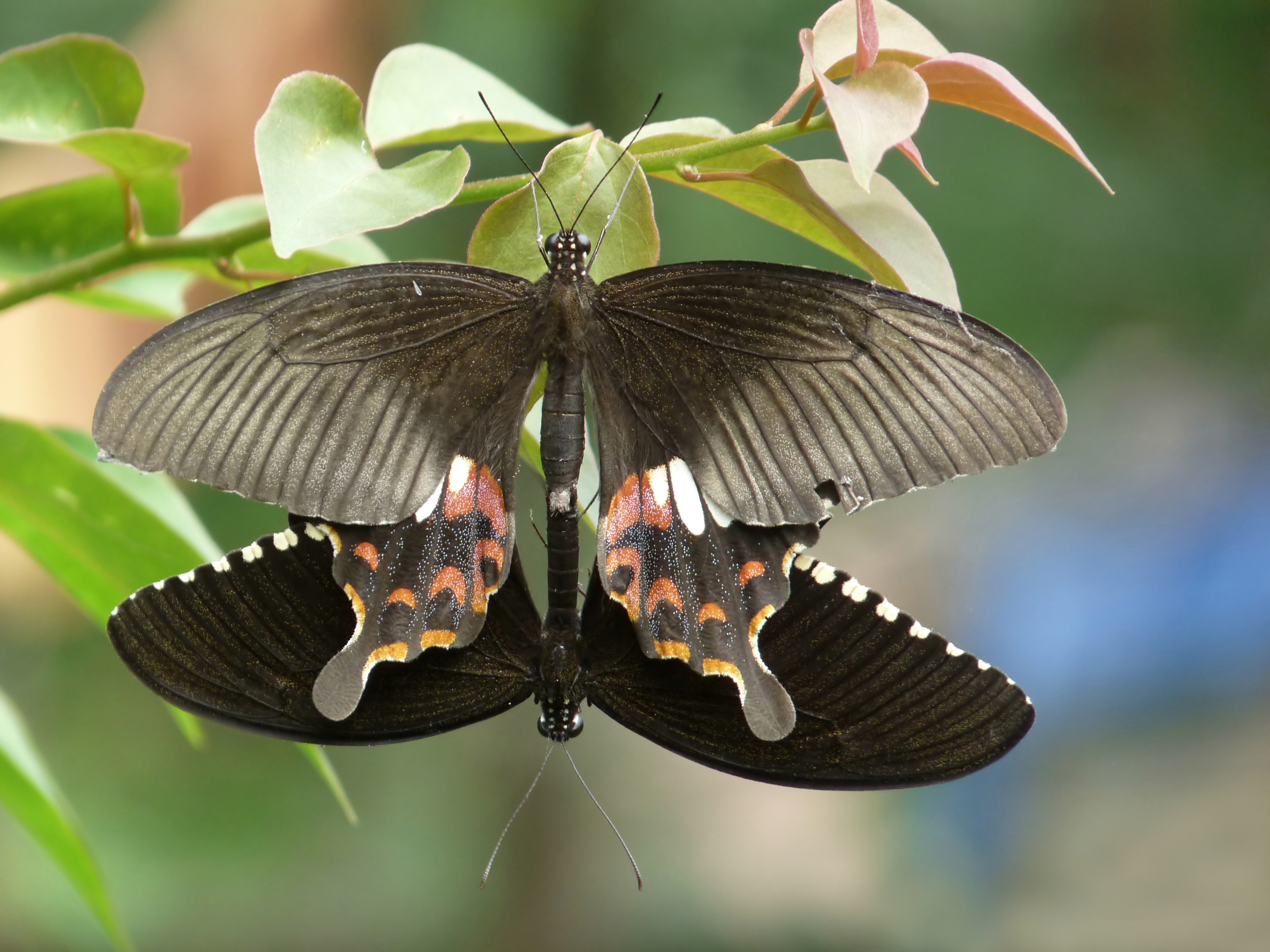
Mating; female form stichius

=== Female ===
The female of the common mormon is polymorphic. In the Indian subcontinent, it has several forms or morphs. These are as follows:
Form cyrus
This form is similar to the male, differing in that it always has strongly marked red crescents. It is the least common of the three forms. It is normally abundant where the common rose or crimson rose do not occur, such as in Himachal Pradesh around Shimla; although a few specimens of form romulus have also been caught alongside.

Form stichius
This female form of the common mormon mimics the common rose very closely. This is the commonest form wherever the common rose flies.
Form romulus
This female form mimics the crimson rose and is common over its range. It is not such a close mimic as the previous form being duller than its model. It is easy to differentiate the mimics from models by the colour of their body—the models are red-bodied and the mimics are black-bodied.

Karl Jordan gives a full account of polytes forma in Seitz (pages 60–63).

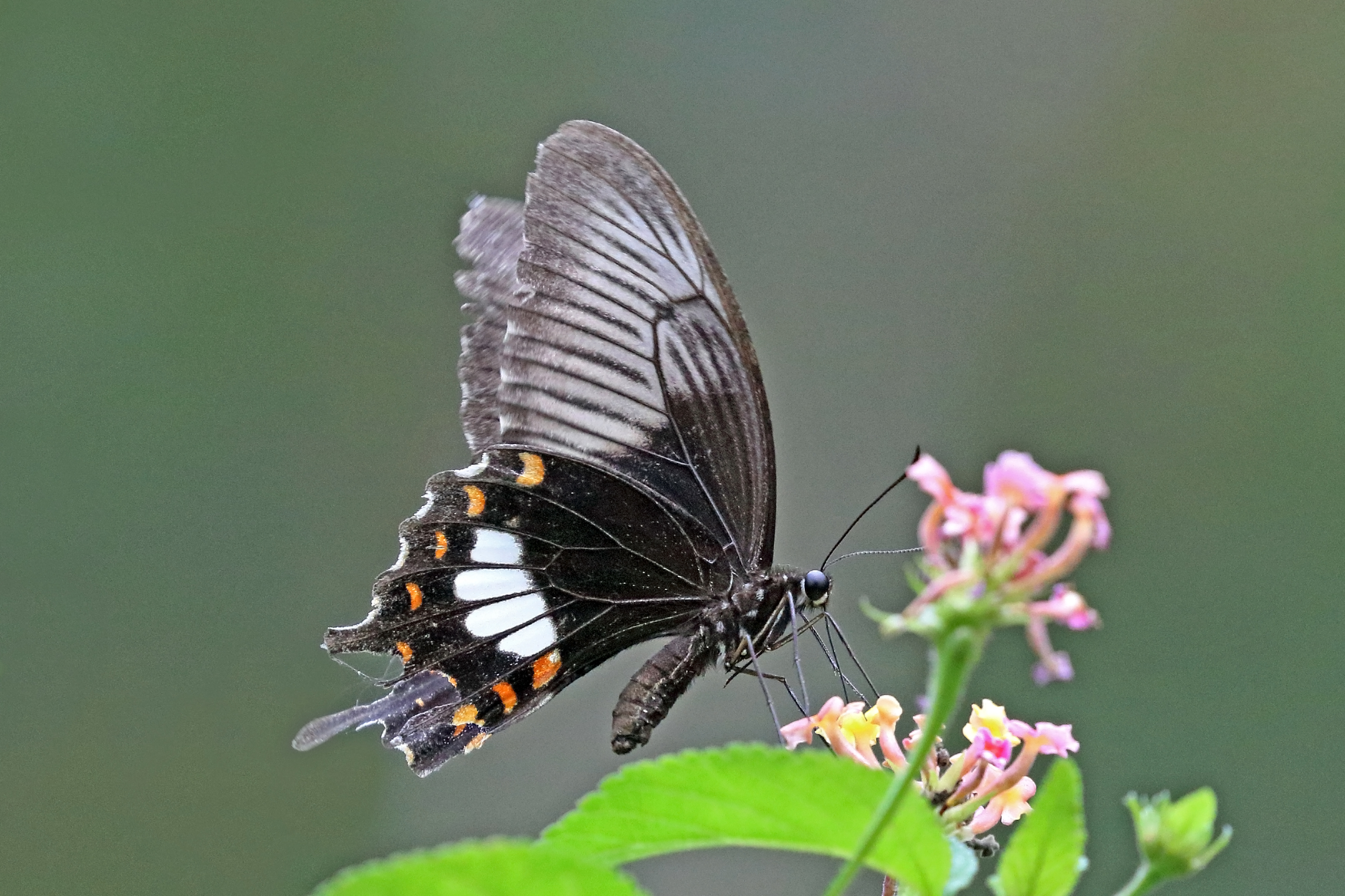
Female form cyrus UN

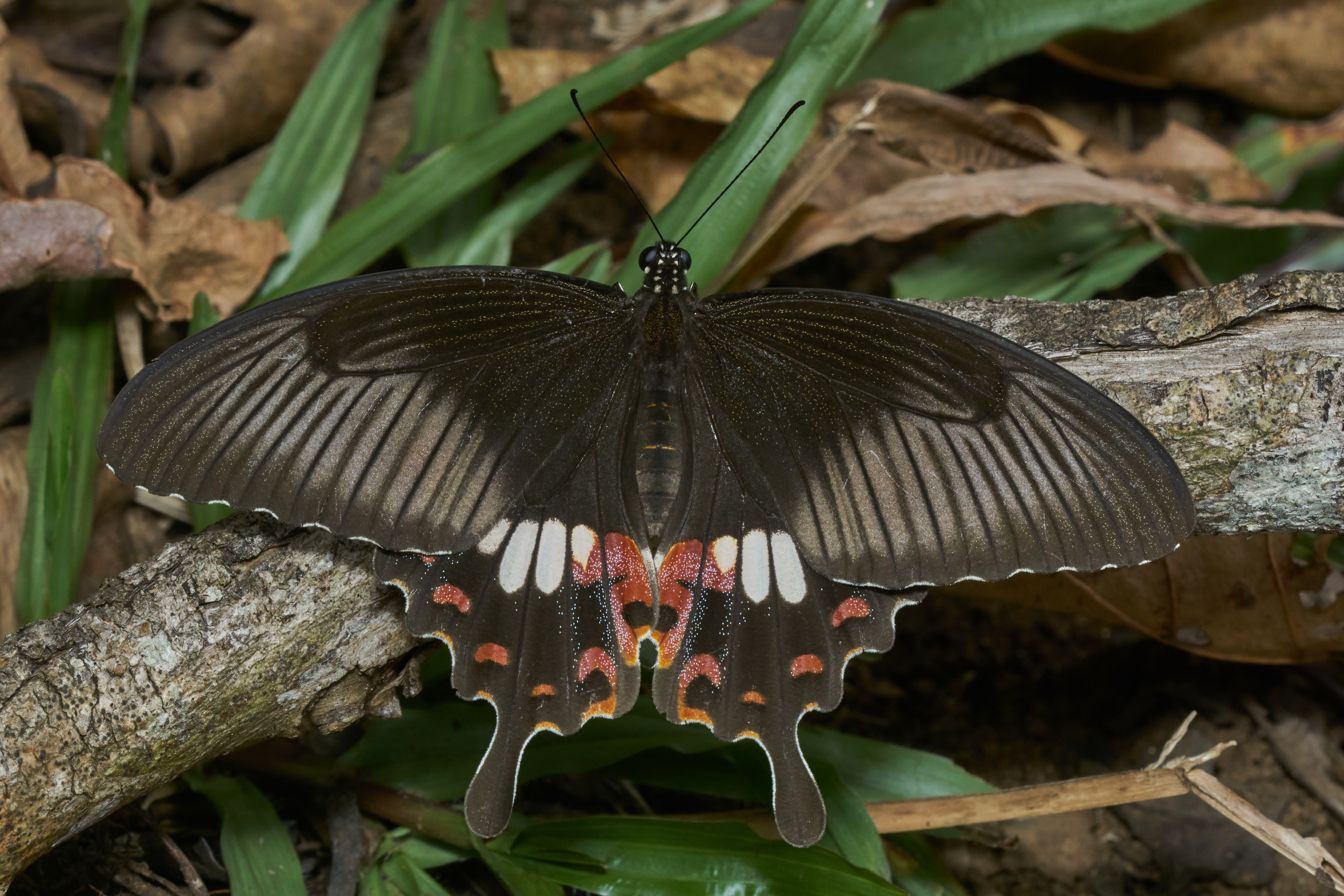
Female form stichius UP

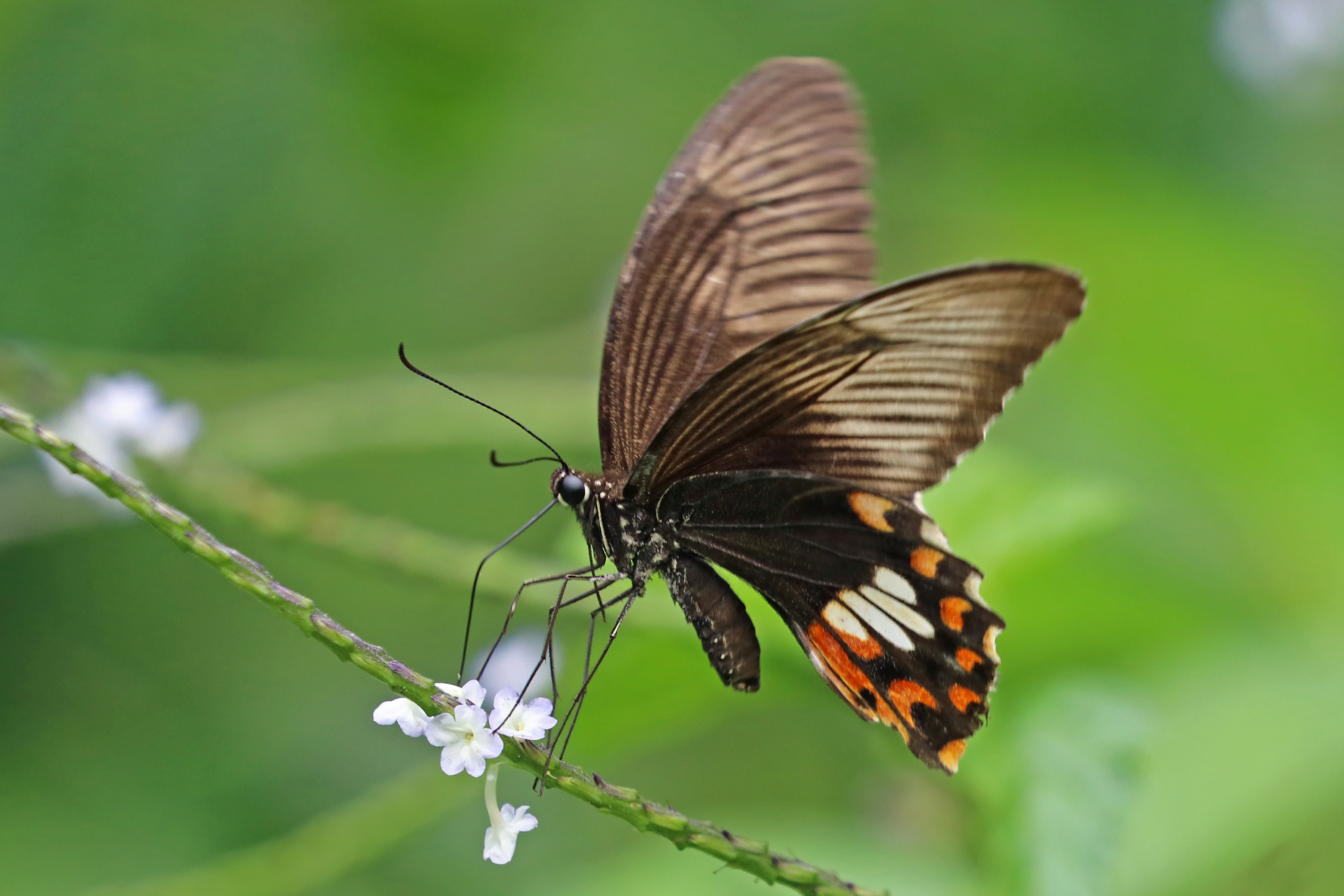
Female form stichius UN

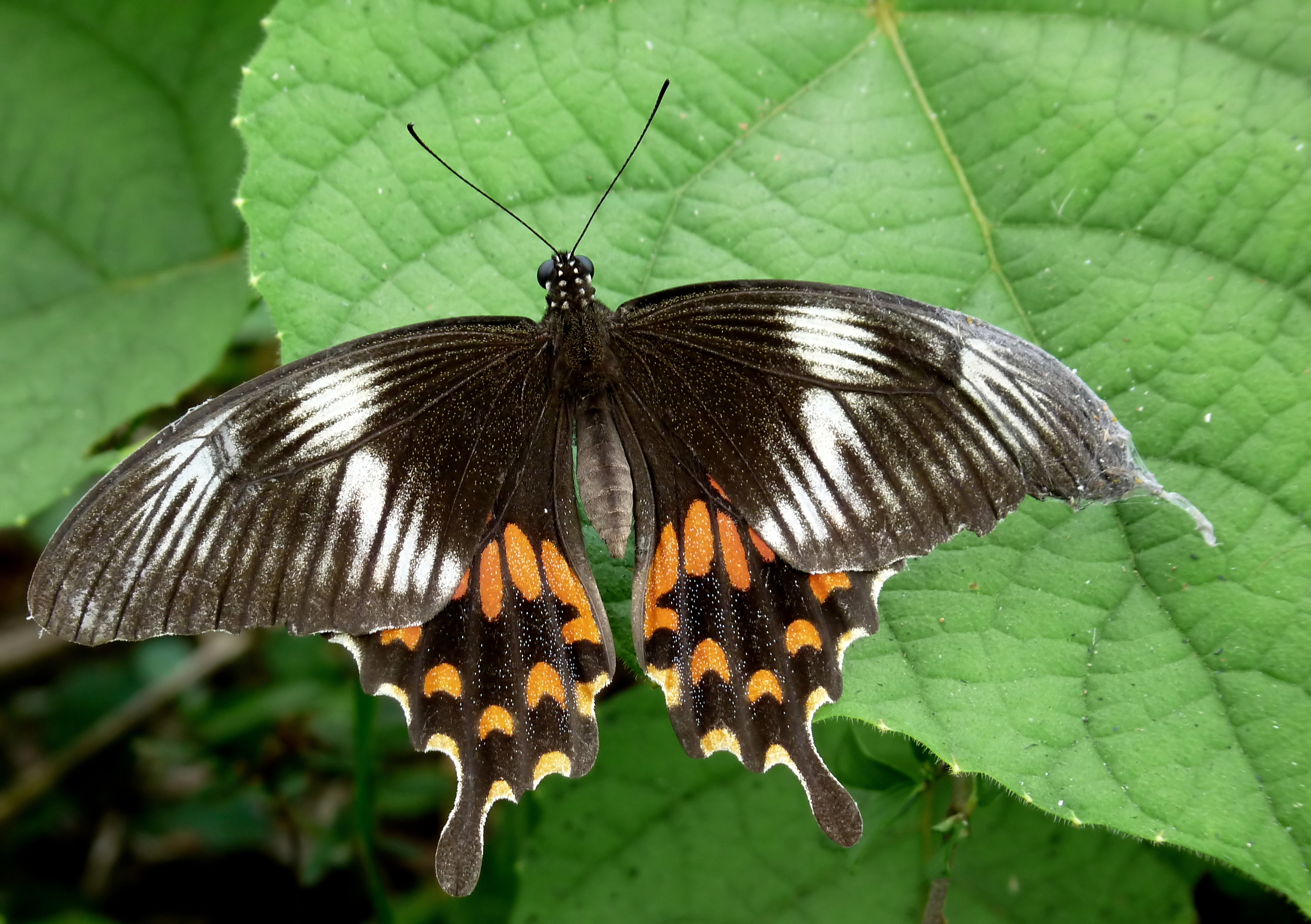
Female form romulus UP

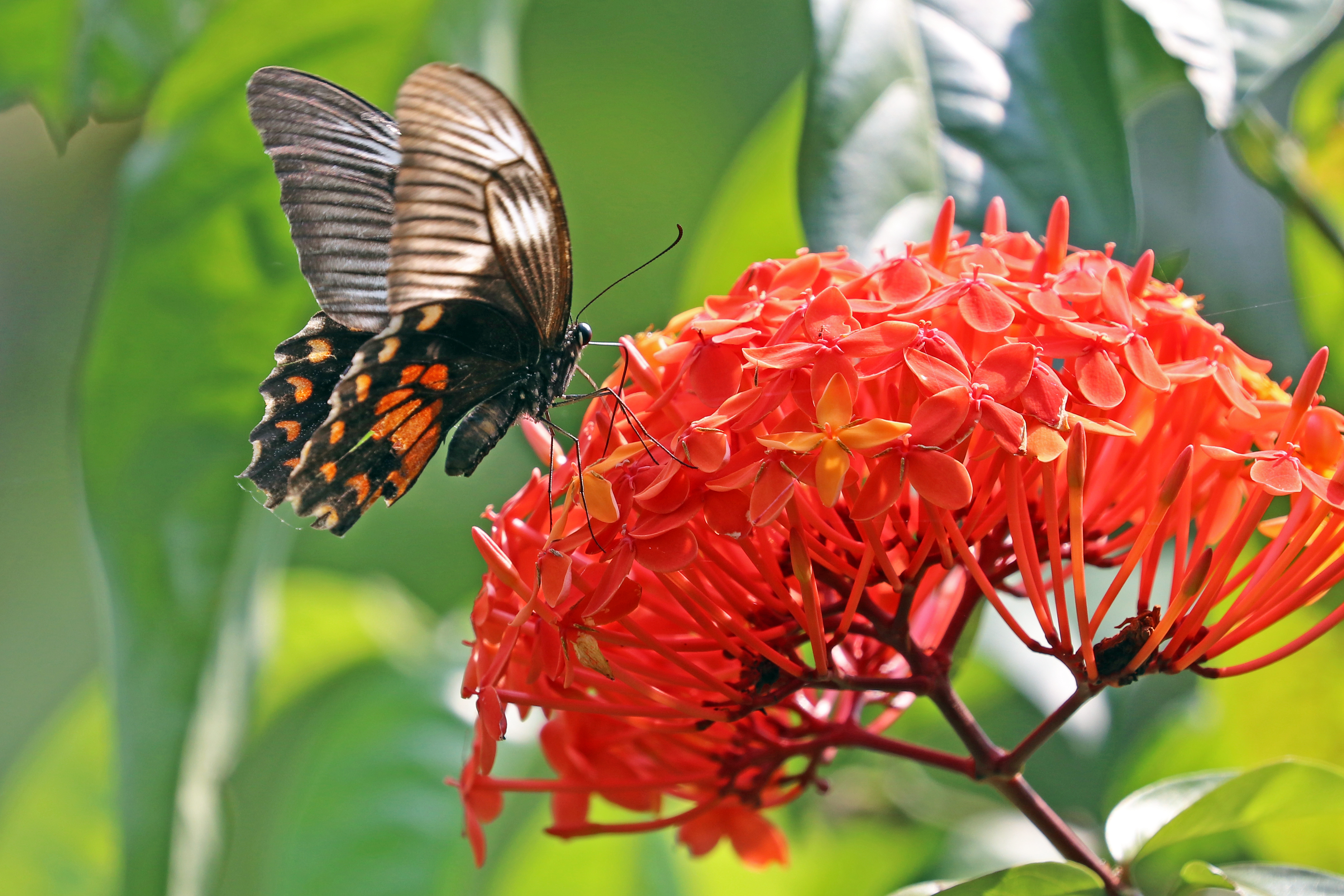
Female form romulus UN

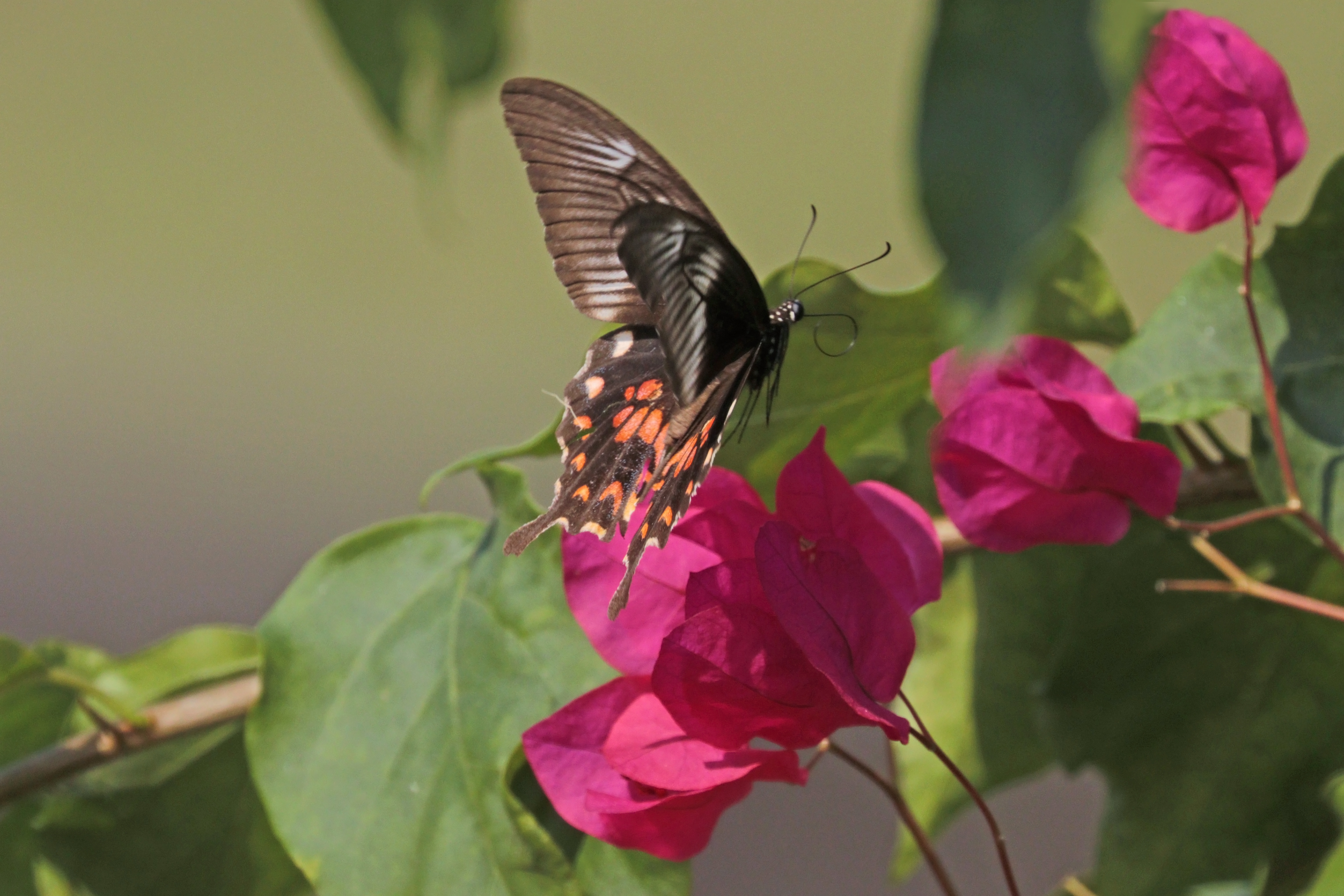
Female form romulus in flight UP

=== Gynandromorphs ===
This species has considerable genetic variability and is known to produce gynandromorphs, genetic aberrations which are part male and part female.

== Taxonomy ==
Papilio polytes is the nominal member of the polytes species group. The clade members are:

- Papilio polytes Linnaeus, 1758
- Papilio ambrax Boisduval, 1832
- Papilio phestus Guérin-Méneville, 1830

The subspecies of Papilio polytes listed alphabetically are:

- P. p. alcindor Oberthür, 1879 – Buton, Salayer & Sulawesi
- P. p. alphenor Cramer, [1776] – Philippines
- P. p. javanus Felder, 1862 – Bali, Bangka, Biliton, Java & southern Sumatra
- P. p. latreilloides Yoshino, 2018 – N. Yunnan, N.E. Vietnam
- P. p. ledebouria Eschscholtz, 1821 – Philippines
- P. p. messius Fruhstorfer, 1909 – Lombok
- P. p. nicanor C. & R. Felder, 1865 – Bachan, Halmahera, Morotai, Obi & Ternate
- P. p. nikobarus C. Felder, 1862 – Nicobar Islands
- P. p. pasikrates Fruhstorfer, 1908 – Philippines (Batanes) & Taiwan
- P. p. perversus Rothschild, 1895 – Sangir & Talaud
- P. p. polycritos Fruhstorfer, 1902 – Banggai, Sula Is.
- P. p. polytes Linnaeus, 1758 – Indo-China, China & Taiwan
- P. p. romulus Cramer, [1775] – Nepal, India, Burma & Sri Lanka
- P. p. rubidimacula Talbot, 1932 – W.Yunnan
- P. p. sakiboso Yoshino, 2018 – W. Sichuan
- P. p. sotira Jordan, 1909 – Sumbawa
- P. p. steffi (Page & Treadaway, 2003) – Bongao, Sibutu & Tawitawi in the Philippines
- P. p. stichioides Evans, 1927 – South Andamans
- P. p. theseus Cramer, [1777] – Sumatra & Borneo
- P. p. timorensis C. & R. Felder, 1864 – Babar Islands, Wetar, Leti, & possibly Timor
- P. p. tucanus Jordan, 1909 – Tukangbesi Islands
- P. p. vigellius Fruhstorfer, 1909 – Bawean

== Mimicry ==
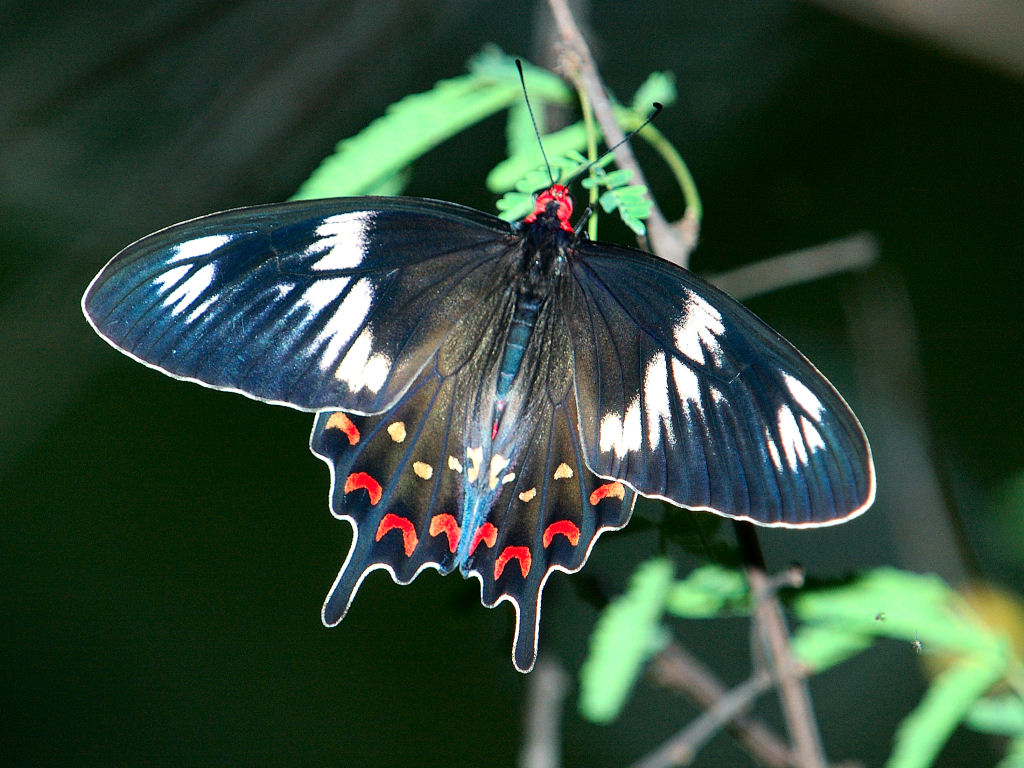
Crimson rose, compare with form romulus

In India, this butterfly is considered as the classic example of Batesian mimicry in which edible species resemble unpalatable butterflies in order to escape being eaten by predators.

The populations of the mimicking morphs of the common mormon are much smaller than that of their models – the common or crimson rose. This allows first time predators a much greater chance of preying upon the unpalatable model in the first instance and thus learning of their inedibility.

Larger populations of mimics could result in the edible common mormon mimics being sampled the first time by predators. If this should happen, the predator may not realise that butterflies of that colour and pattern are protected by the poisons they ingest; thus dramatically reducing the effectiveness of this scheme of protection.

In Sulawesi, although the common rose is abundant, the common Mormon female morph which is found there, mimics a completely different butterfly, Atrophaneura polyphontes.

A single gene, doublesex, regulates the complex wing patterns, colors and structures required for this mimicry.

== Habitat ==
The common Mormon lives in forests of several types, from deciduous woodland to semi-evergreen and evergreen forest. It is also common in areas of human habitation and is often encountered in gardens and wooded places. It prefers lightly wooded country, but is present everywhere and high up into the hills. It is a regular visitor to gardens, being especially abundant in orchards of its food plants—oranges and limes. It is most common in the monsoon and post-monsoon months.

== Behavior ==
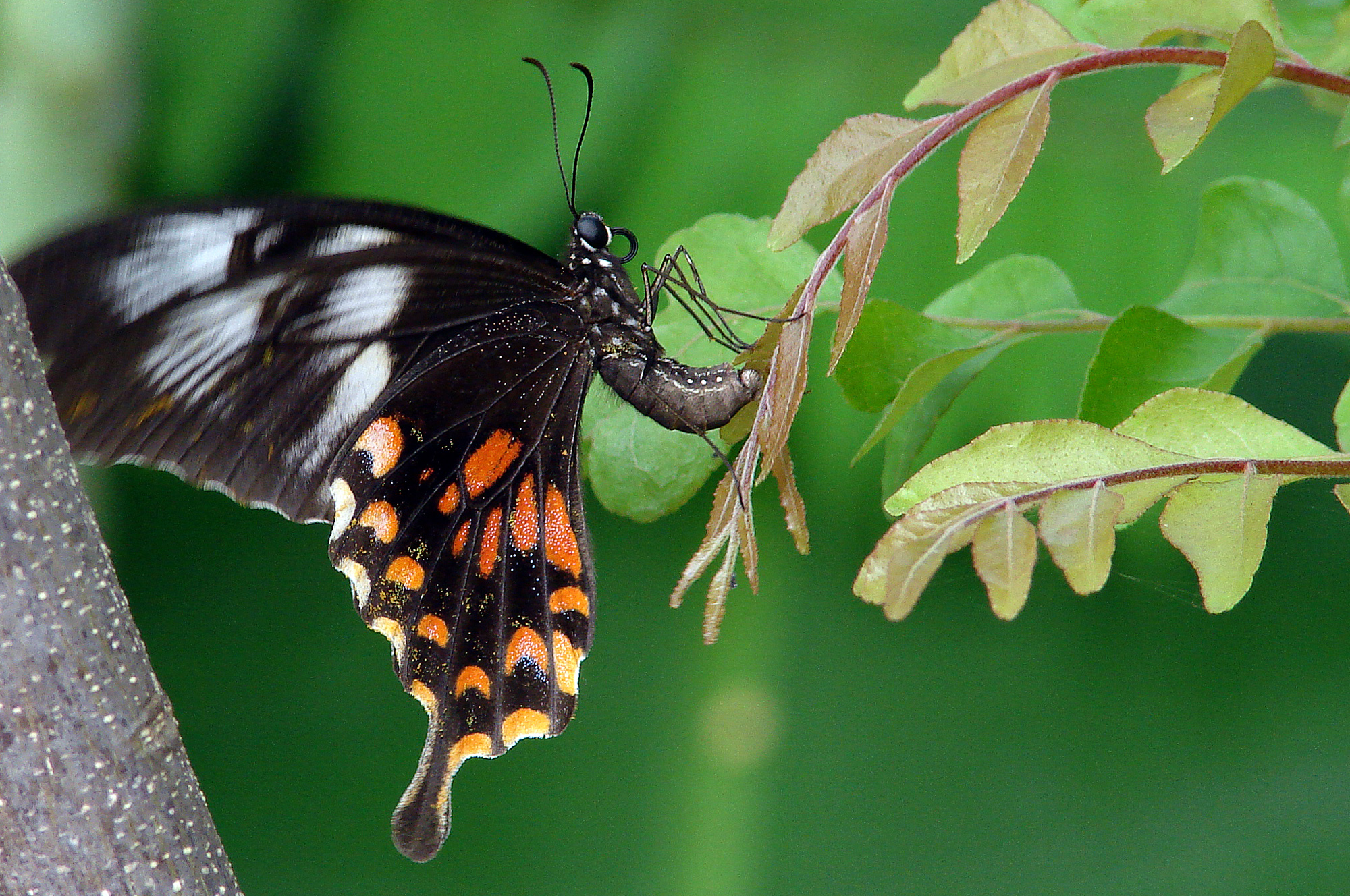
Female form romulus seen laying an egg on Murraya paniculata

The common Mormon is fond of visiting flowers and its long proboscis permits it to feed from flowers having long corollar tubes. It is particularly fond of Lantana, Jatropha, Ixora, and Mussaenda in city gardens. In the forests, the common Mormon remains low keeping within ten feet off the floor and its prefer to visit Asystasia, Peristrophe, and Jasminum for nectar.

The male common Mormon is a very common visitor to gardens where he will be seen hovering over flowers when the sun is shining. It is a restless insect, zigzagging fast and straight close to the ground, settling down only when it halts to feed.

The mimic female Mormons, stichius and romulus are very convincing mimics due to their habits, especially the flight patterns, being very similar to those of the rose models. However, lacking the protection of inedibility, they tend to be more easily disturbed than the roses and fly off erratically.

Only the males take part in mud puddling, usually in cool shaded spots rather than in open areas. They have been known to collect on saline soils to extract minerals.

Both sexes bask in the sun on shrubs close to the ground. They hold their wings flat against the substratum. The forewing is lowered to cover part of the hindwing and is a typical stance of the common Mormon.

Common Mormons spend the night settled on vegetation with their wings held open, usually quite close to the ground.

== Life cycle ==
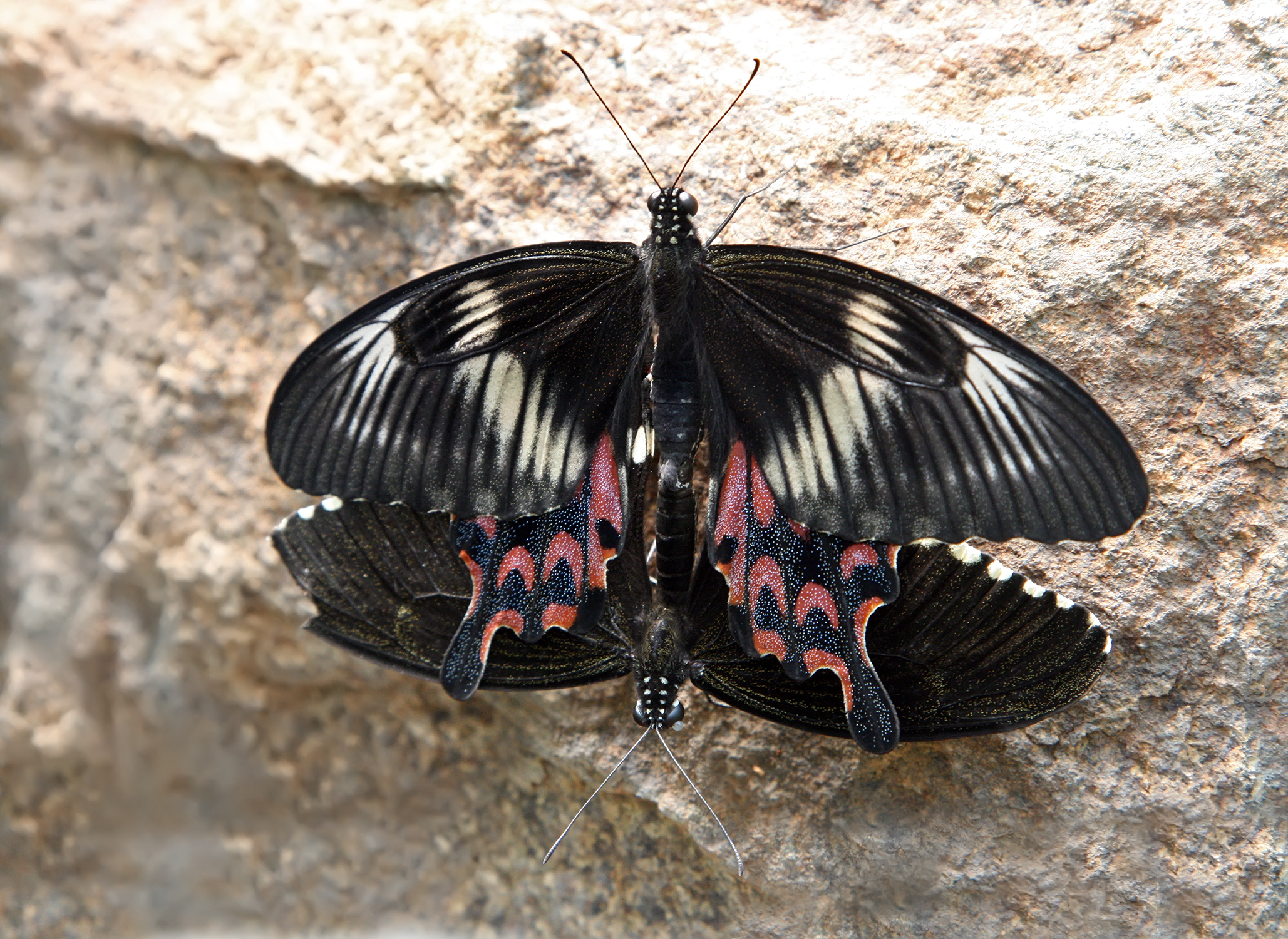
Mating pair with the female displaying romulus form on top

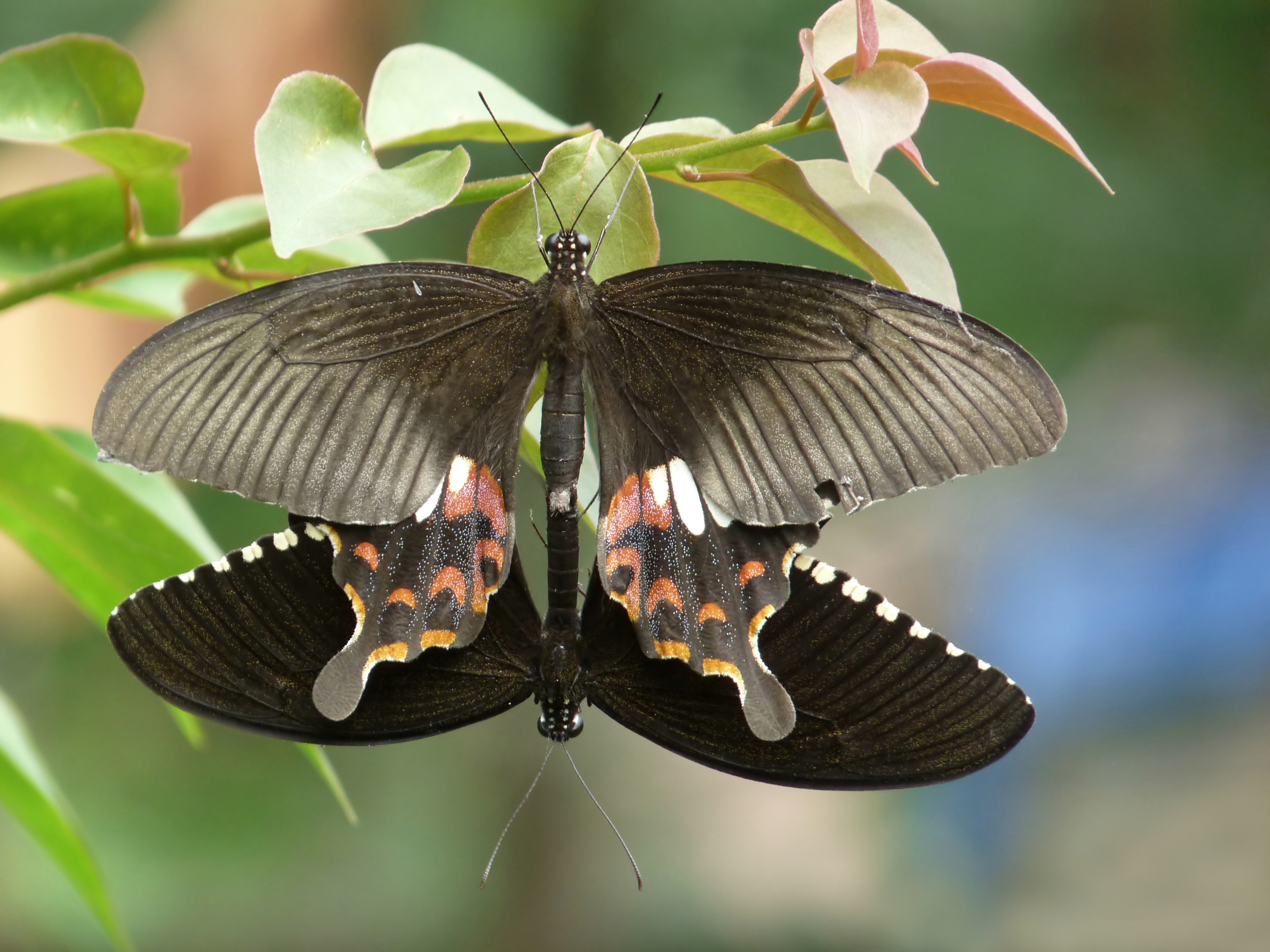
Mating pair with the female displaying stichius form on top

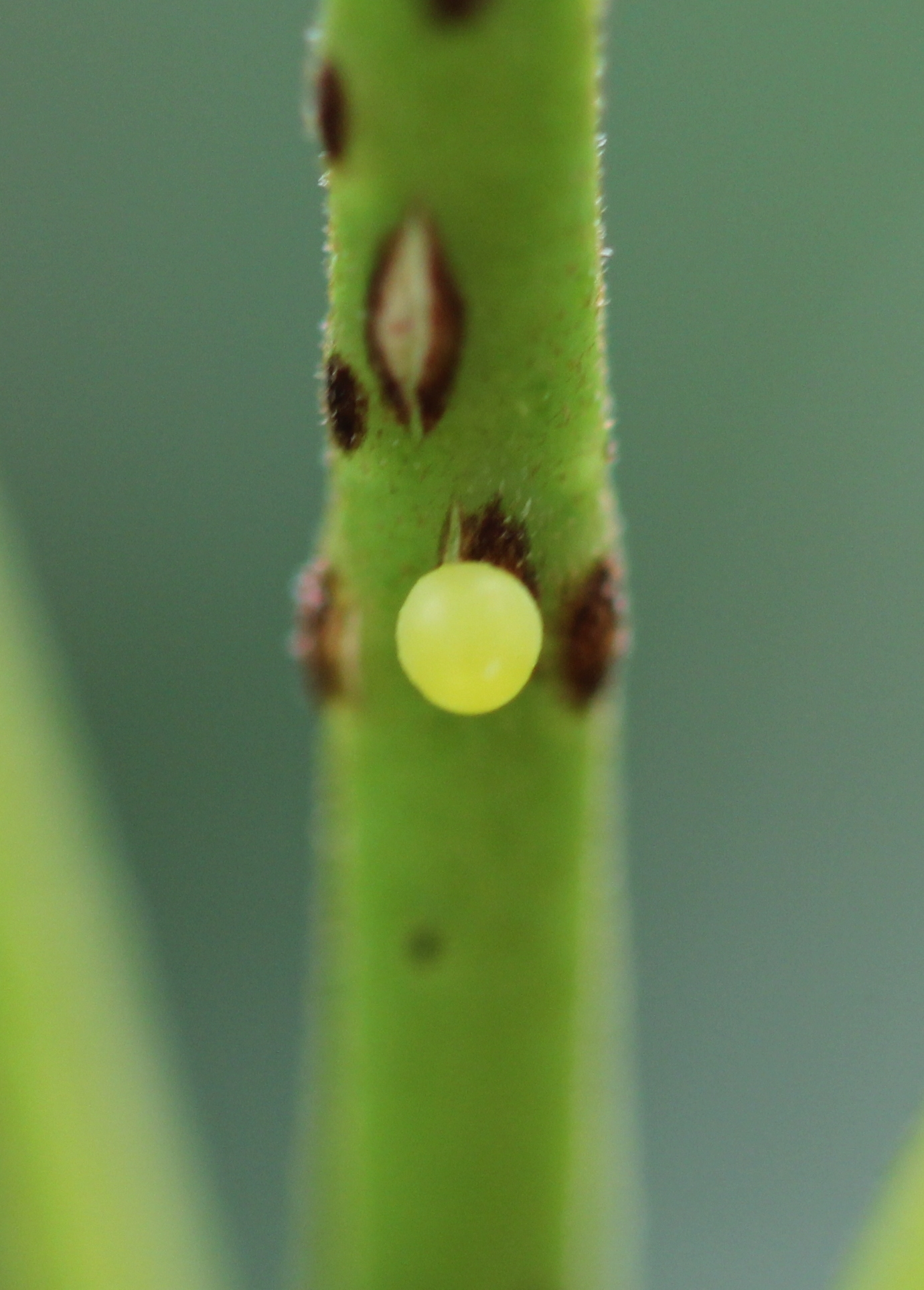
Common Mormon egg

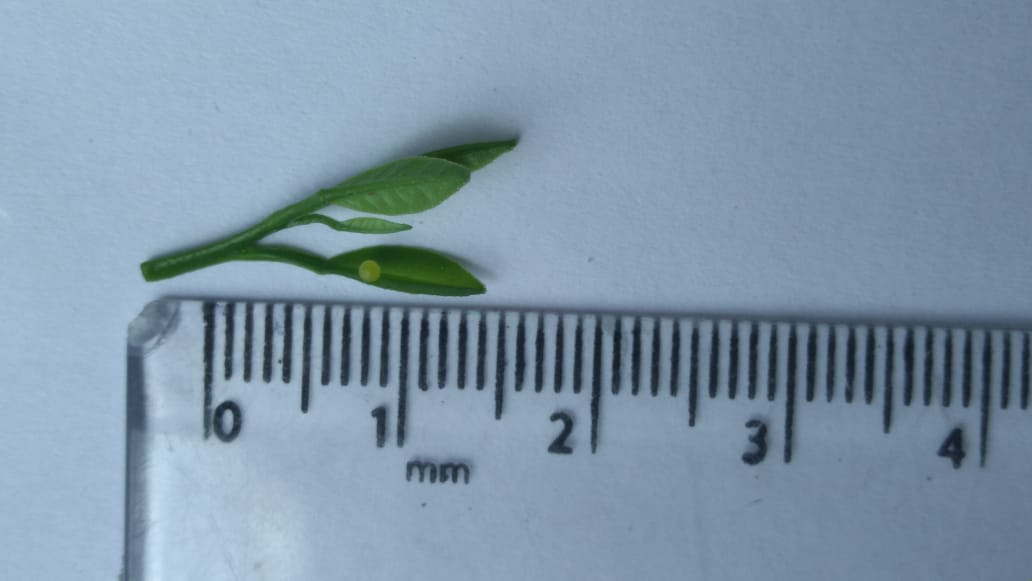
Egg

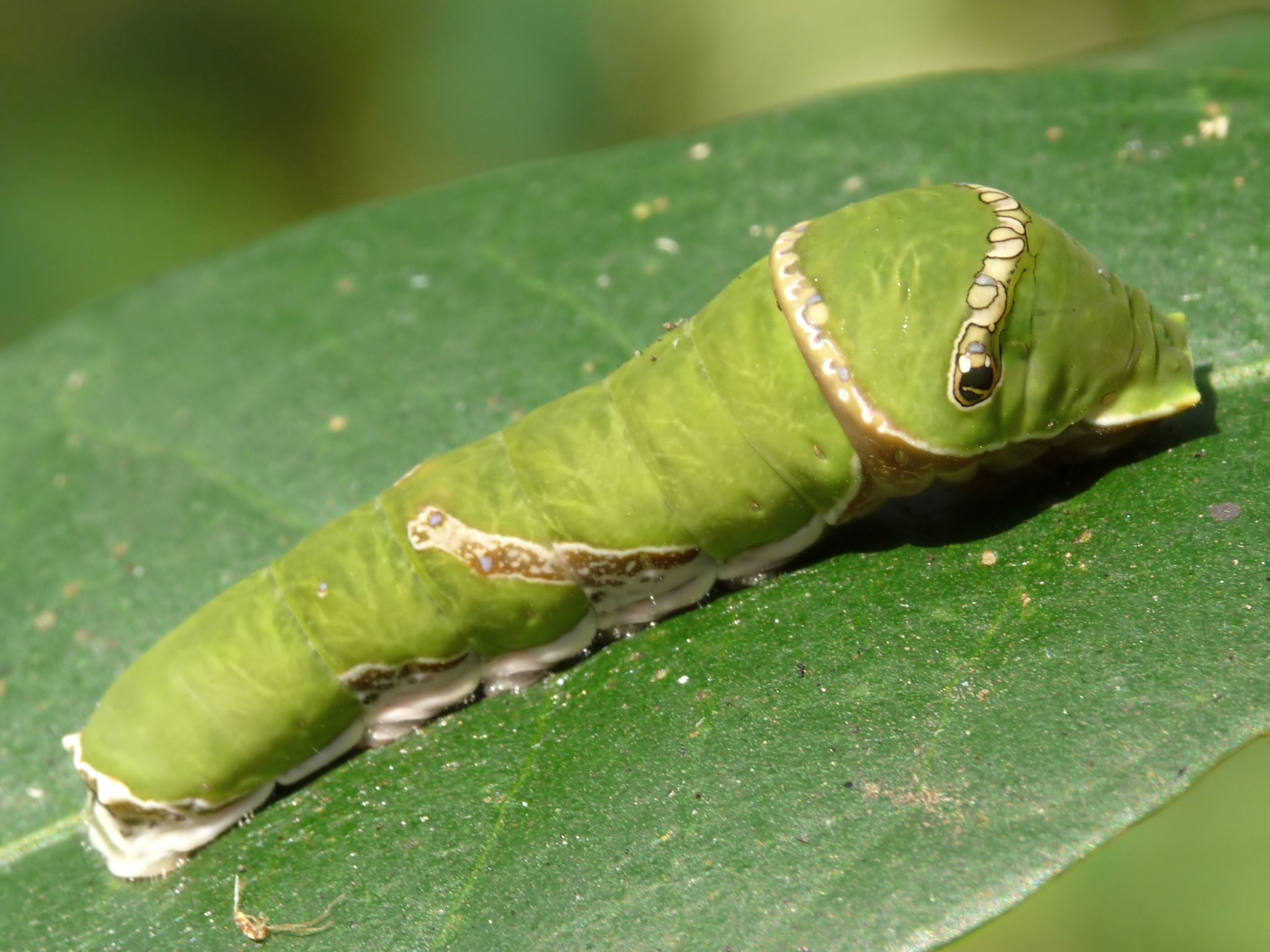
Fifth instar

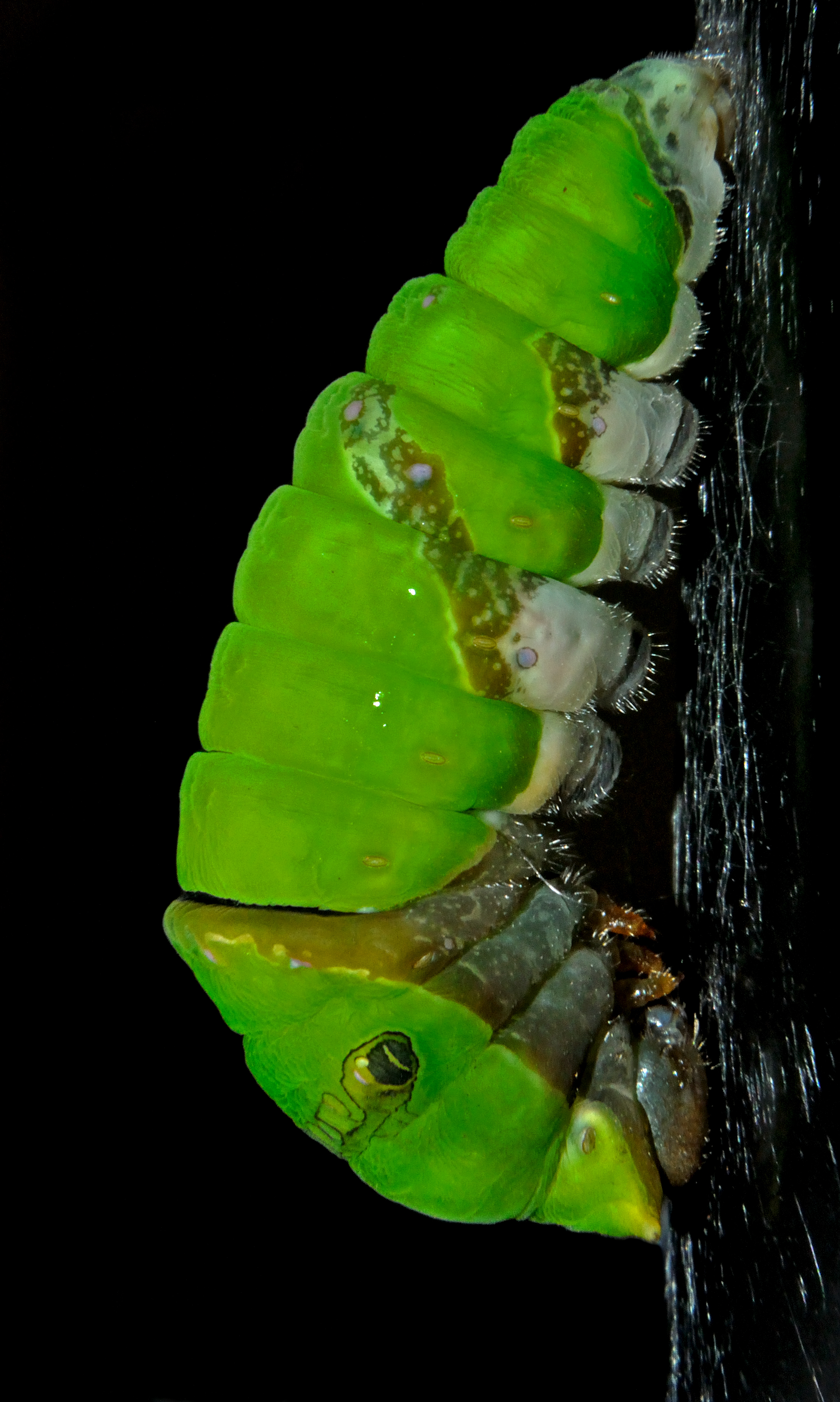
Pre-pupa caterpillar

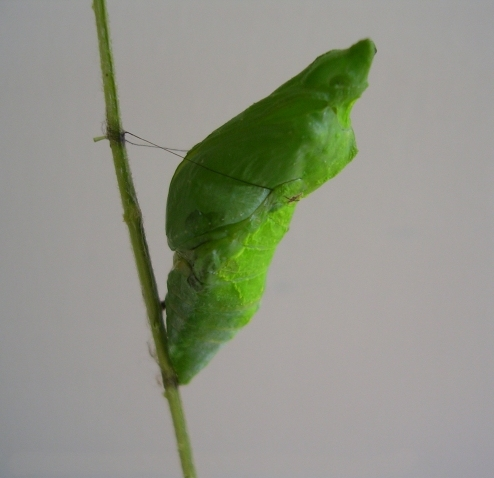
Pupa

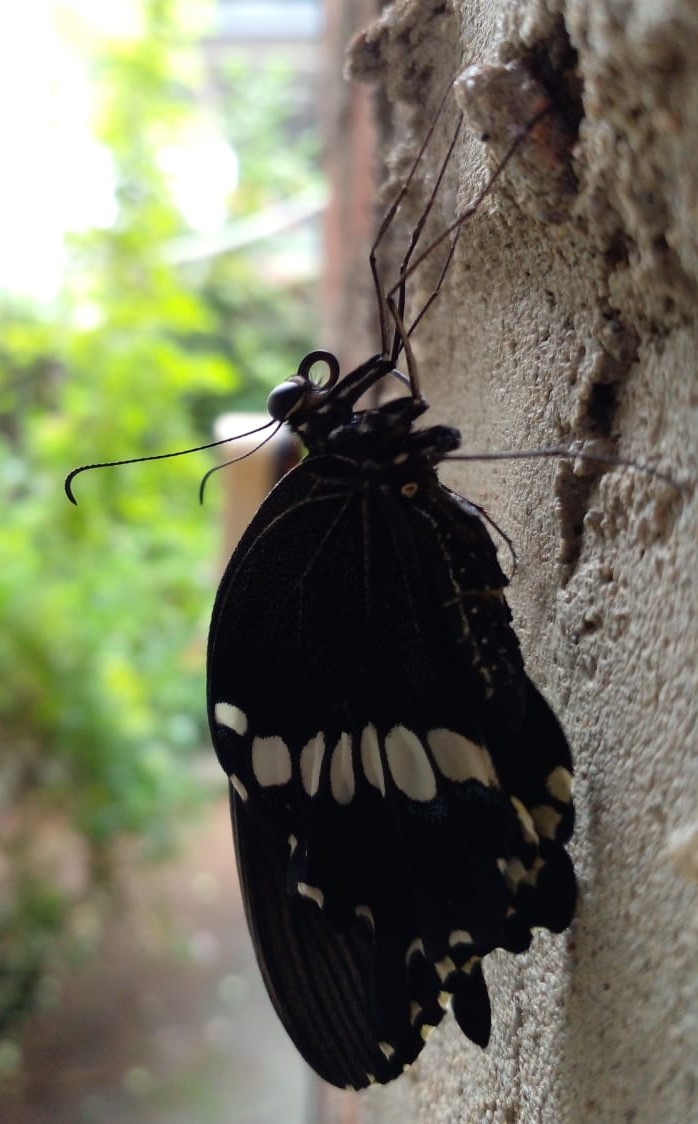
Newly emerged common Mormon butterfly

The females perch on an exposed branch with wings open or closed. They are courted by the males who approach from behind and slowly and elegantly settle into position.

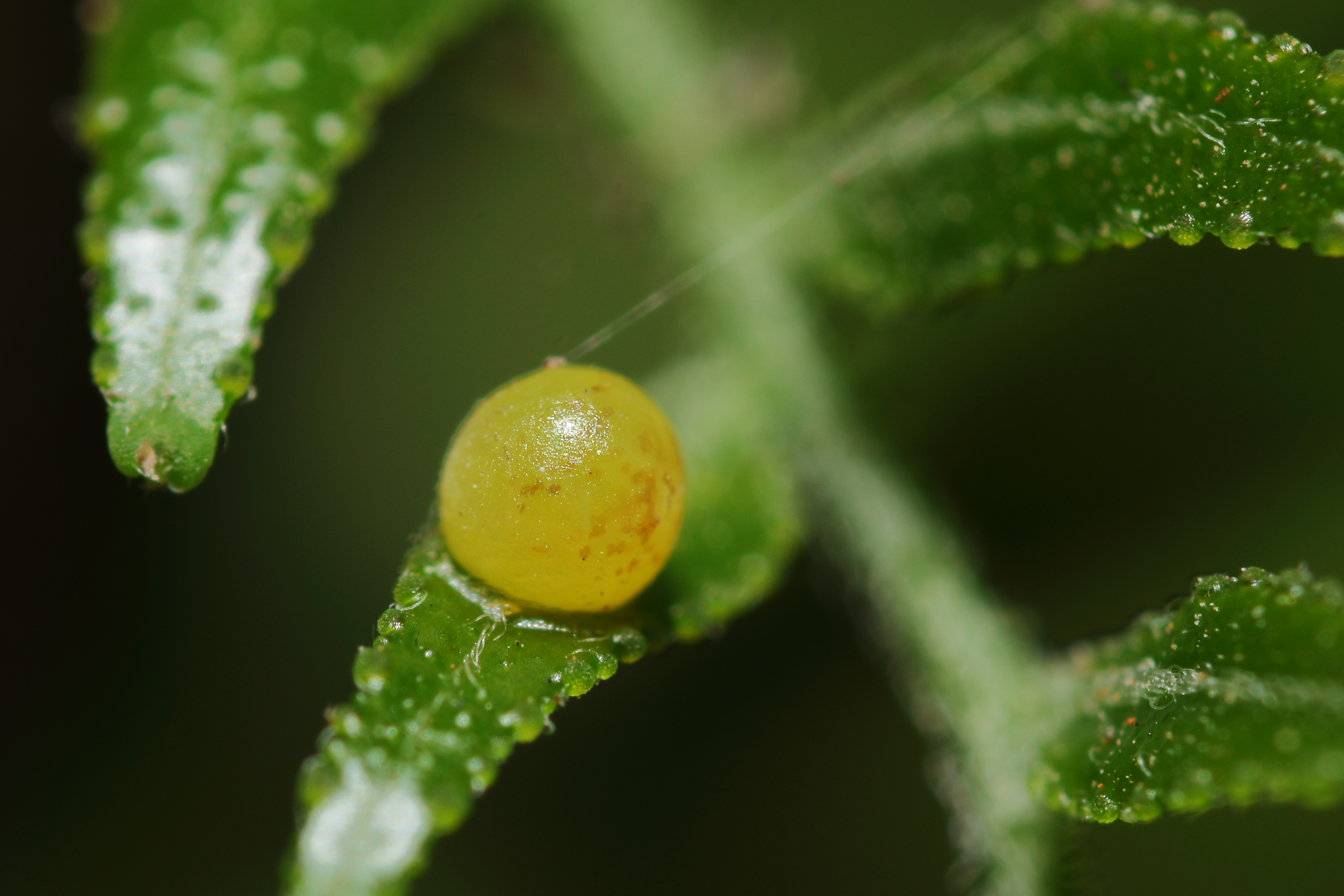
Egg of Papilio polytes

=== Eggs ===
The eggs are laid singly on top of the leaves. They are round and yellow to light-yellow in colour.

=== Caterpillar ===
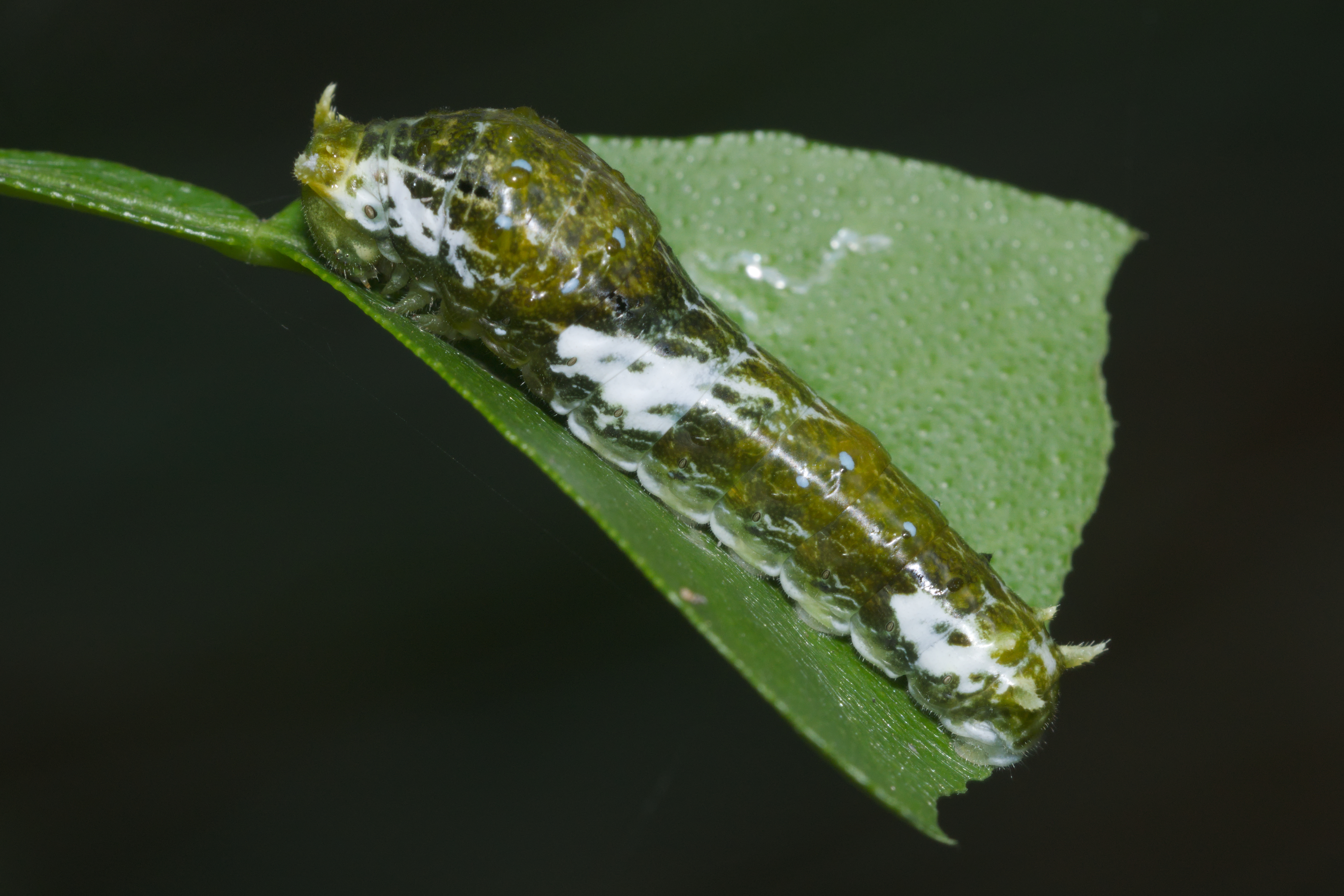
Bird dropping-like camouflage of early instar caterpillar. Kadavoor, India

The first few instars of the caterpillar closely resemble those of the lime butterfly. They feature white splotches that look like bird droppings that serve as camouflage.

The later instars become dark green in colour. There is a transverse black band with an eye-spot on each side on the 4th and 5th segments. This band, being darker and brighter than that of the lime butterfly caterpillar, is the key distinction between the two.

The common mormon caterpillar also has a black and white oblique band on the 8th and 9th segments, making it resemble that of the blue mormon. The deep red osmeterium and yellowish-brown head help distinguish it from the blue Mormon caterpillar which has a greenish head.

Growth rates of caterpillars of common mormon differed by host plant species when experimented on five plant species. Growth rates were fastest for caterpillars on M. koenigii followed by caterpillars on T. asiatica, C. medica, G. pentaphylla and A. marmelos. This variation is thought to be due to varying nutrient content of the plant species.

Common Mormon caterpillars are heavily parasitised by chalcidoid wasps, with over a hundred tiny wasps eventually emerging from each Mormon pupa.

=== Pupa ===
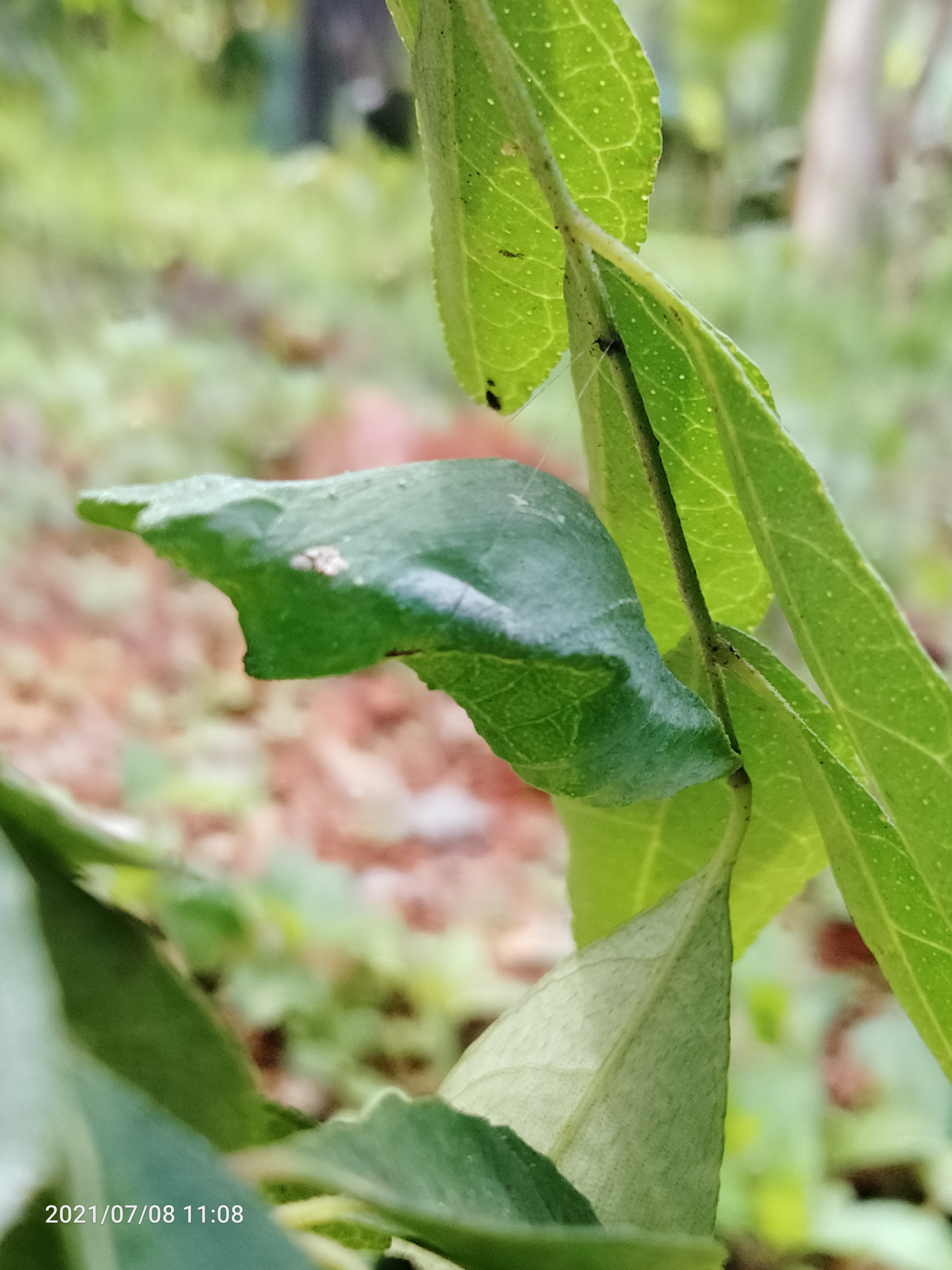
Papilio polytes common Mormon pupa

The pupa is located on underside of leaves and twigs. The pupa is light green and unmarked. It has two projections to the front on its head and also one on its thorax. It closely resembles the lime butterfly caterpillar but can be distinguished by:

- the projections on the head which have a deeper indentation between them.
- the abdomen which protrudes to a small point on each side.

== Food plants ==
The larvae breed on various species of family Rutaceae including:

- Aegle marmelos or bael
- Atalantia racemosa
- Citrus spp. (C. aurantifolia, C. grandis, C. limon, C. medica, C. sinensis)
- Glycosmis arborea
- Murraya koenigii – curry leaf
- Murraya paniculata

== See also ==
- List of butterflies of India
- List of butterflies of India (Papilionidae)
