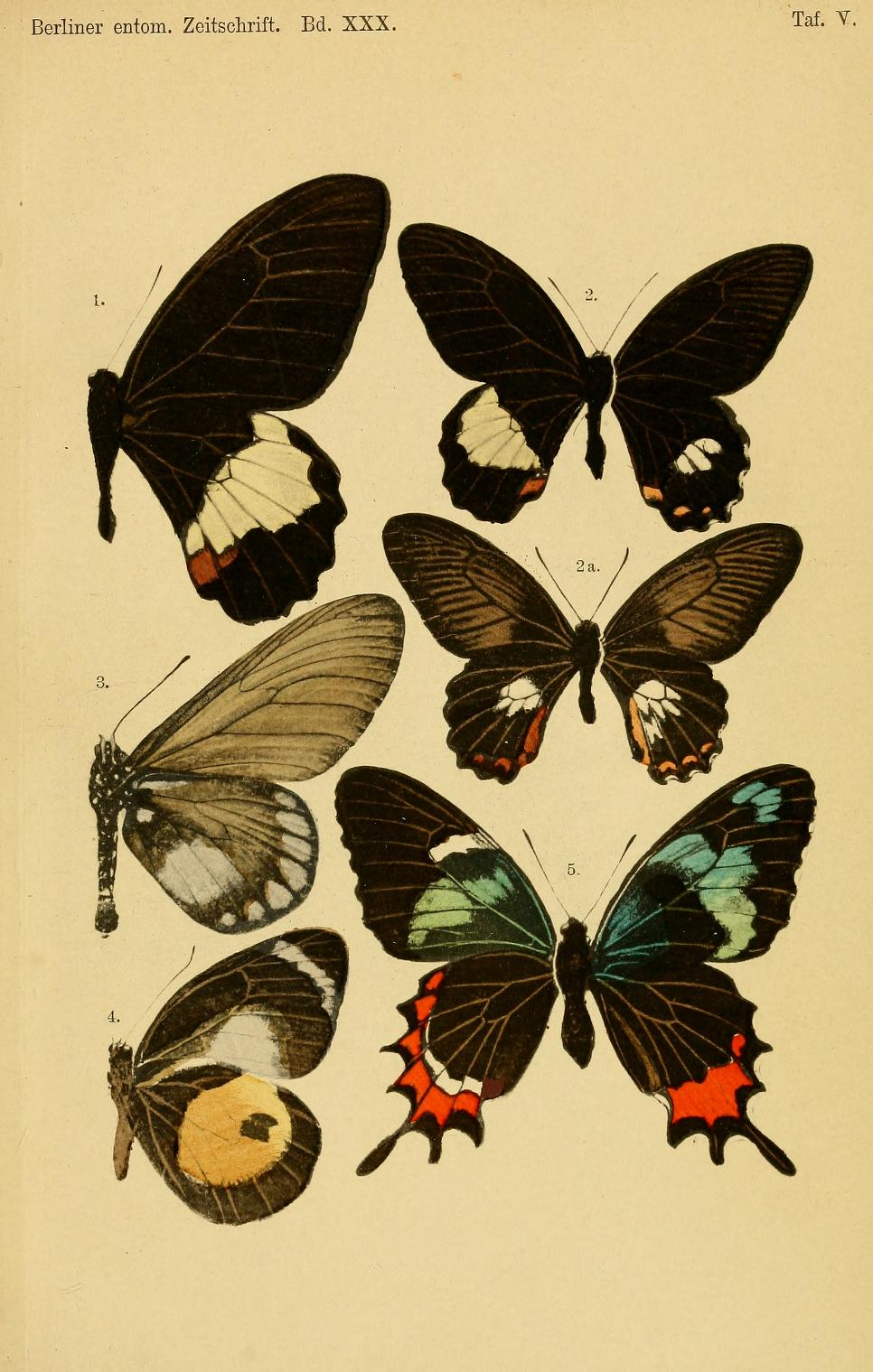
- Papilio phestus parkinsoni Honrath, 1886 Fig.1 Papilio parkinsoni var. minor Honrath, 1886 Figs.2,2a

Scientific classification
- Kingdom: Animalia
- Phylum: Arthropoda
- Clade: Pancrustacea
- Class: Insecta
- Order: Lepidoptera
- Family: Papilionidae
- Genus: Papilio
- Species: P. phestus

Binomial name
- Papilio phestus Guérin-Méneville, 1830

Synonyms
- Papilio parkinsoni Honrath, 1886; Papilio parkinsoni var. minor Honrath, 1886; Papilio parkinsoni var. minusculus Ribbe, 1898

= Papilio phestus =

Species of butterfly

Papilio phestus is a species of swallowtail butterfly from the genus Papilio that is found on Solomon Islands, New Britain, New Ireland, New Hanover Island, and Admiralty Island.

== Description ==
The subcostal of the hindwing branches off from the cell at a greater distance from the base than in P. ambrax. Palpi black or with a little white scaling. Male: similar to P.ambrax , but the hind¬ wing beneath always with pure white discal spots and above always with a rather large red anal spot. Female:forewing as in the male without white marginal spots or these extremely small. The white area of the hind¬ wing smaller than in the ambrax female and purer white than in those specimens of ambrax in which the white area is reduced; the veins intersecting it always black. Larva similar to that of ambrax, but according to Ribbe’s figure the abdominal bands are interrupted above as in the western forms of polytes, and the longitudinal stripe is grey with blackish bordering.Karl Jordan in Seitz.

== Biology ==
The larvae feed on Citrus species.

== Subspecies ==
- Papilio phestus phestus (New Ireland, New Hanover)
- Papilio phestus parkinsoni Honrath, 1886 Male the white band of the hindwing above broad, beneath on the contrary the discal spots reduced in number and size.Female with large white patch on the forewing. (New Britain)
- Papilio phestus reductus Rothschild, 1915 (Admiralty Islands)
- Papilio phestus minusculus Ribbe, 1898 (Solomon Islands to New Georgia Group) Males from the Solomon Islands have usually the band on the hindwing narrower and also more deeply incised and the veins are mostly thinly but distinctly black.

== Biogeographic realm ==
This species is located in the Australasian realm.

== Taxonomy ==
Papilio phestus is a member of the polytes species-group. The clade members are

- Papilio polytes Linnaeus, 1758
- Papilio ambrax Boisduval, 1832
- Papilio phestus Guérin-Méneville, 1830

== See also ==
- East Melanesian Islands
