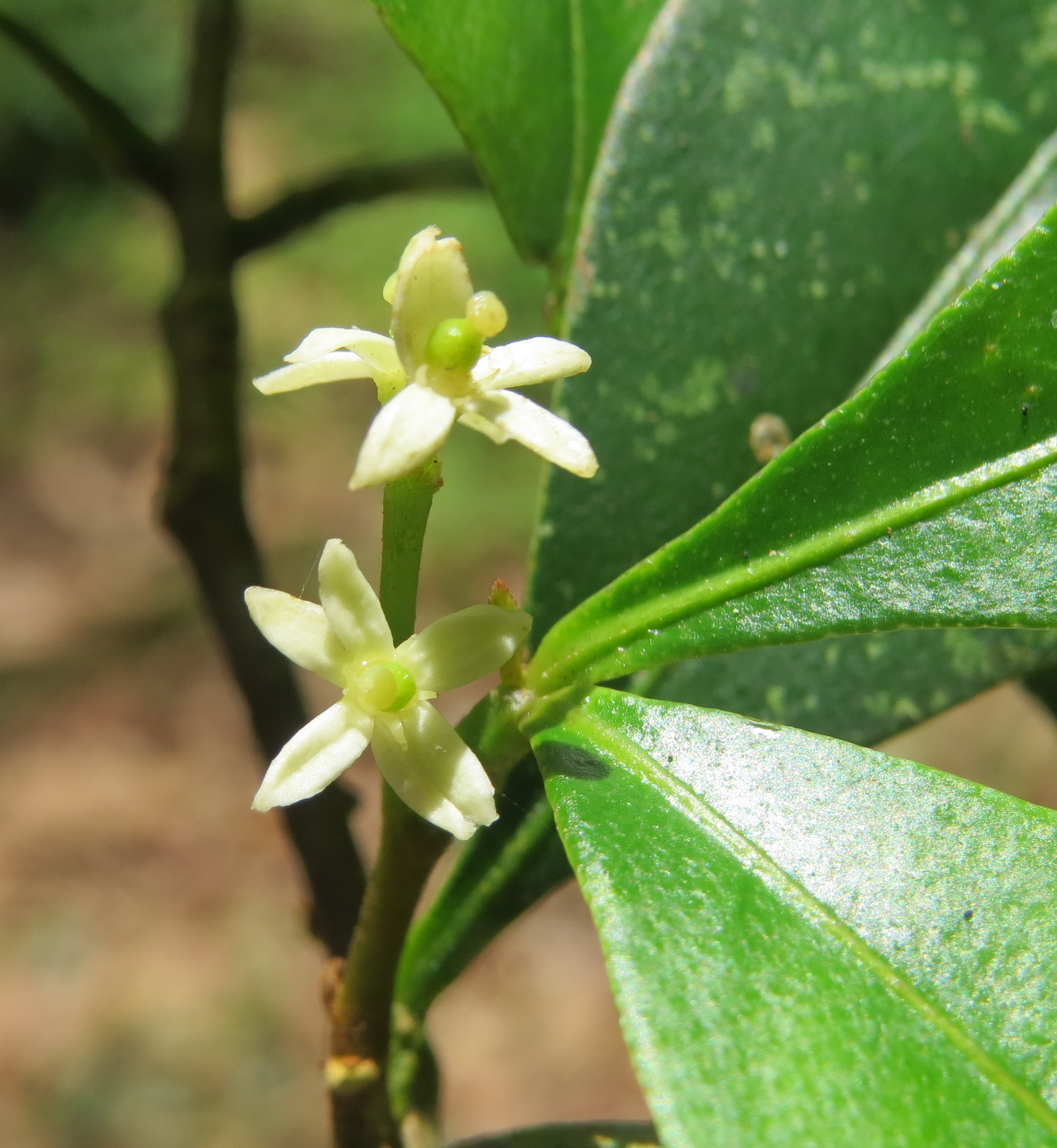
- Female flowers

Conservation status
- Least Concern (IUCN 3.1)

Scientific classification
- Kingdom: Plantae
- Clade: Embryophytes
- Clade: Tracheophytes
- Clade: Spermatophytes
- Clade: Angiosperms
- Clade: Eudicots
- Clade: Rosids
- Order: Sapindales
- Family: Rutaceae
- Genus: Zanthoxylum
- Species: Z. ovalifolium

Binomial name
- Zanthoxylum ovalifolium Wight

Synonyms
- Fagara ovalifolia (Wight) Engl.; Fagara varians Domin; Zanthoxylon ovalifolium Wight orth. var.; Zanthoxylum dominianum Merr. & L.M.Perry; Zanthoxylum inerme C.T.White & W.D.Francis nom. illeg.; Zanthoxylum suberosum C.T.White

= Zanthoxylum ovalifolium =

Thorny yellowwood

Species of flowering plant

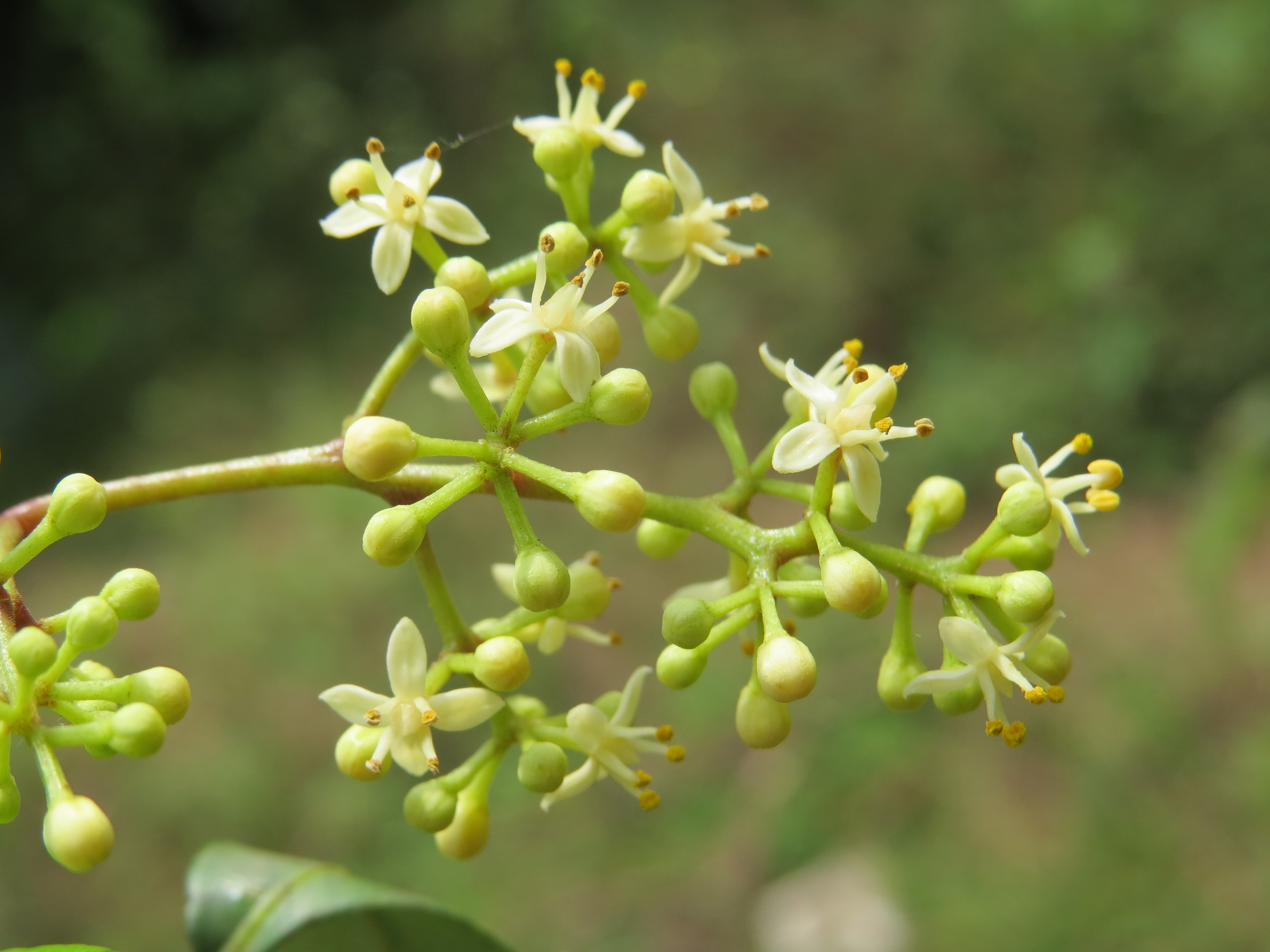
Male flowers

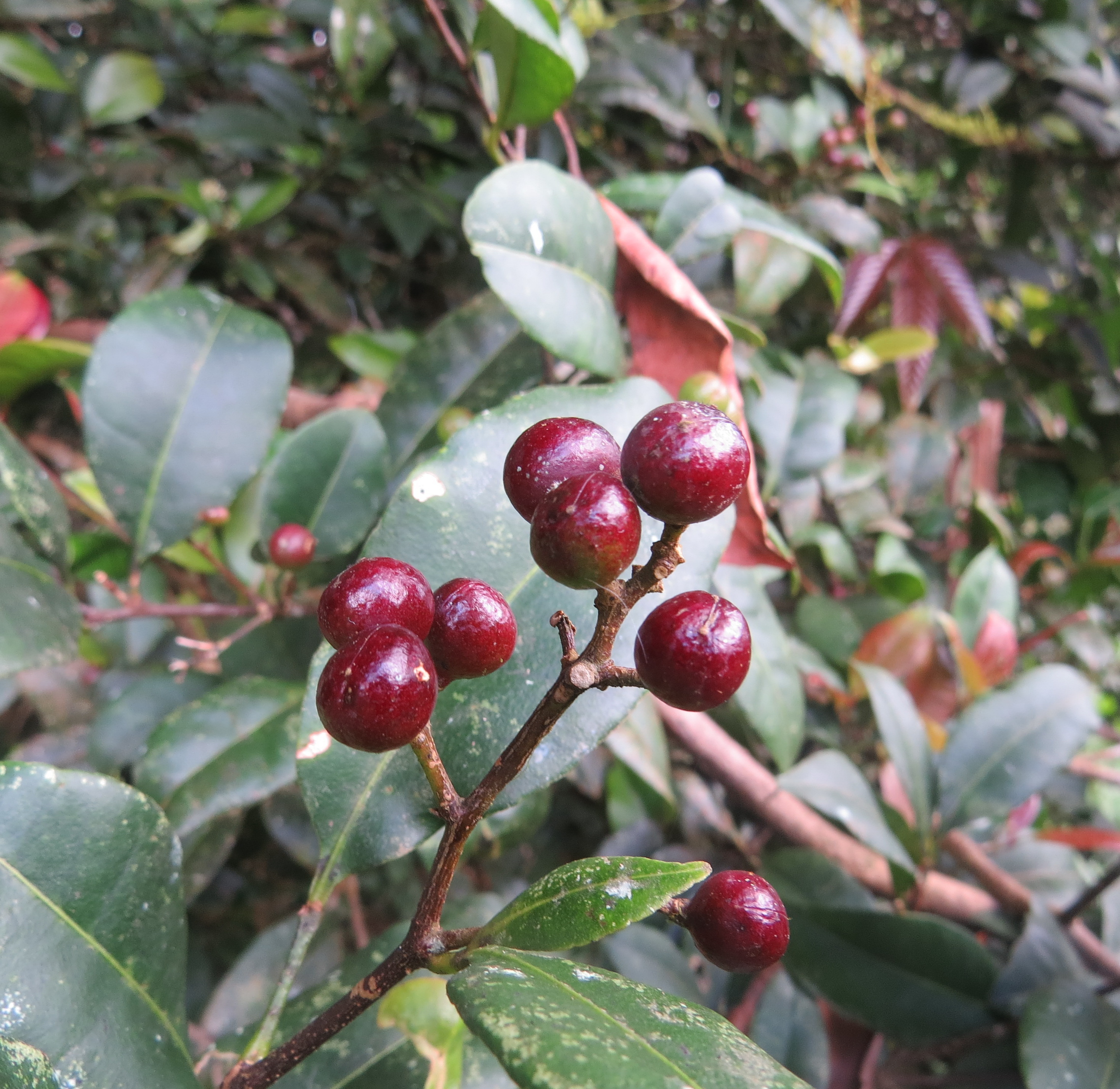
Fruit

Zanthoxylum ovalifolium, commonly known as thorny yellowwood, oval-leaf yellow wood or little yellowwood, is a species of flowering plant in the family Rutaceae. It is a shrub or tree usually with trifoliate leaves, white, male and female flowers arranged in panicles in leaf axils or on the ends of branchlets and red, purple or brown follicles.

== Description ==
Zanthoxylum ovalifolium is a shrub or tree that typically grows to a height of 8 m (26 ft) and often has prickles on its branchlets and thick, conical spines on its older stems. It has trifoliate leaves 75–210 mm (3.0–8.3 in) long, often with simple leaves on the same twig. The leaflets are elliptical to egg-shaped with the lower end towards the base, 60–180 mm (2.4–7.1 in) long, 25–70 mm (0.98–2.76 in) wide and sessile, the end leaflet sometimes on a petiolule up to 5 mm (0.20 in) long. The flowers are arranged in leaf axils, on the ends of branchlets, or both, in panicles up to 120 mm (4.7 in) long, each flower on a pedicel 2.5–3 mm (0.098–0.118 in) long. The four sepals are 0.5–1 mm (0.020–0.039 in) long and the four petals white and about 2.5 mm (0.098 in) long. Male flowers have four stamens 2.5–3 mm (0.098–0.118 in) long with a sterile, narrow oval carpel about 0.5 mm (0.020 in) high. Female flowers have a single carpel 1.5–2 mm (0.059–0.079 in) long, and sometimes rudimentary stamens. Flowering occurs in summer and the fruit is a spherical red, purple or brown follicle 6.5 mm (0.26 in) wide.

== Taxonomy ==
Zanthoxylum ovalifolium was first formally described in 1839 by Robert Wight in his book, Illustrations of Indian Botany, from specimens collected in the "Shevagerry hills in flower, and fruit in August and September".

== Distribution and habitat ==
Thorny yellowwood is a widespread species, found from India, through southeast Asia, Malesia, New Guinea, and Queensland. In Australia it occurs between the Daintree River and Ravenshoe, growing in rainforest at altitudes between 100 and 1,260 m (330 and 4,130 ft).

== Uses ==
=== Timber ===
Thorny yellowwood is a timber tree valued for its hard, yellowish-white, close-grained wood.

=== Medicinal uses ===
The fruits of this species are reported to have "astringent, stimulative, and digestive properties".

=== Essential oils ===
The fruits yield the essential oils myrcene and safrole.
