= Merrillia =

Conservation status
- Vulnerable (IUCN 2.3)

Scientific classification
- Kingdom: Plantae
- Clade: Tracheophytes
- Clade: Angiosperms
- Clade: Eudicots
- Clade: Rosids
- Order: Sapindales
- Family: Rutaceae
- Subfamily: Aurantioideae
- Genus: Merrillia; Swingle
- Species: M. caloxylon

Binomial name
- Merrillia caloxylon (Ridl.) Swingle

Synonyms
- Murraya caloxylon Ridl.

Genus of trees

Merrillia is a monotypic genus of flowering plants in the citrus family, Rutaceae, containing the single species Merrillia caloxylon. Its English language common names include flowering merrillia, katinga, and Malay lemon. In Malaysia it is called ketenggah and kemuning gajah. The species is native to Malaysia, Thailand, and Sumatra in Indonesia.

This species is a member of the Rutaceae subfamily Aurantioideae, which includes the genus Citrus. It has been placed as the only genus and species in the subtribe Merrilliinae, which are known technically as the large-fruited remote citroid fruit trees. The genus is sunk into Murraya by some sources, but accepted in a 2021 classification of the Rutaceae.

== Description ==
This species is a tree often reaching up to 20 meters tall, sometimes approaching 30 meters. One report from 1932 mentions a specimen collected from a tree 33.6 meters tall. If the report is valid it would be the largest tree of the Aurantioideae. The trunk has a light, flaking bark. The leaves can exceed 20 centimeters in length, and each is made up of 5 to 13 leaflets up to about 10 centimeters long, the basal ones smaller than the others. They are thin, bright green, and somewhat lance-shaped with triangular bases. The flowers are solitary, paired, or borne in panicles. They are white to yellow-green and trumpet-shaped with petals up to 1.8 centimeters long. The oblong fruit is up to 11 centimeters long by 7.5 wide. It has a warty peel over a centimeter thick. It is green, turning yellow with maturity. The fruit contains a tasteless, fibrous, olive-green pulp.

The native habitat of the tree includes primary and secondary tropical forest.

== Uses ==
The species has been noted for its wood, which is bright yellow with dark brown streaks. It is a hard wood used historically in Malaysia to make walking sticks and kris handles. It was also good for making furniture and boxes. The species was too rare to provide a supply of commercial timber.

Several coumarins have been isolated from the roots, including one named merrillin. The alkaloid yuehchukene has been found in the bark; it is a compound well known from the related genus Murraya.
