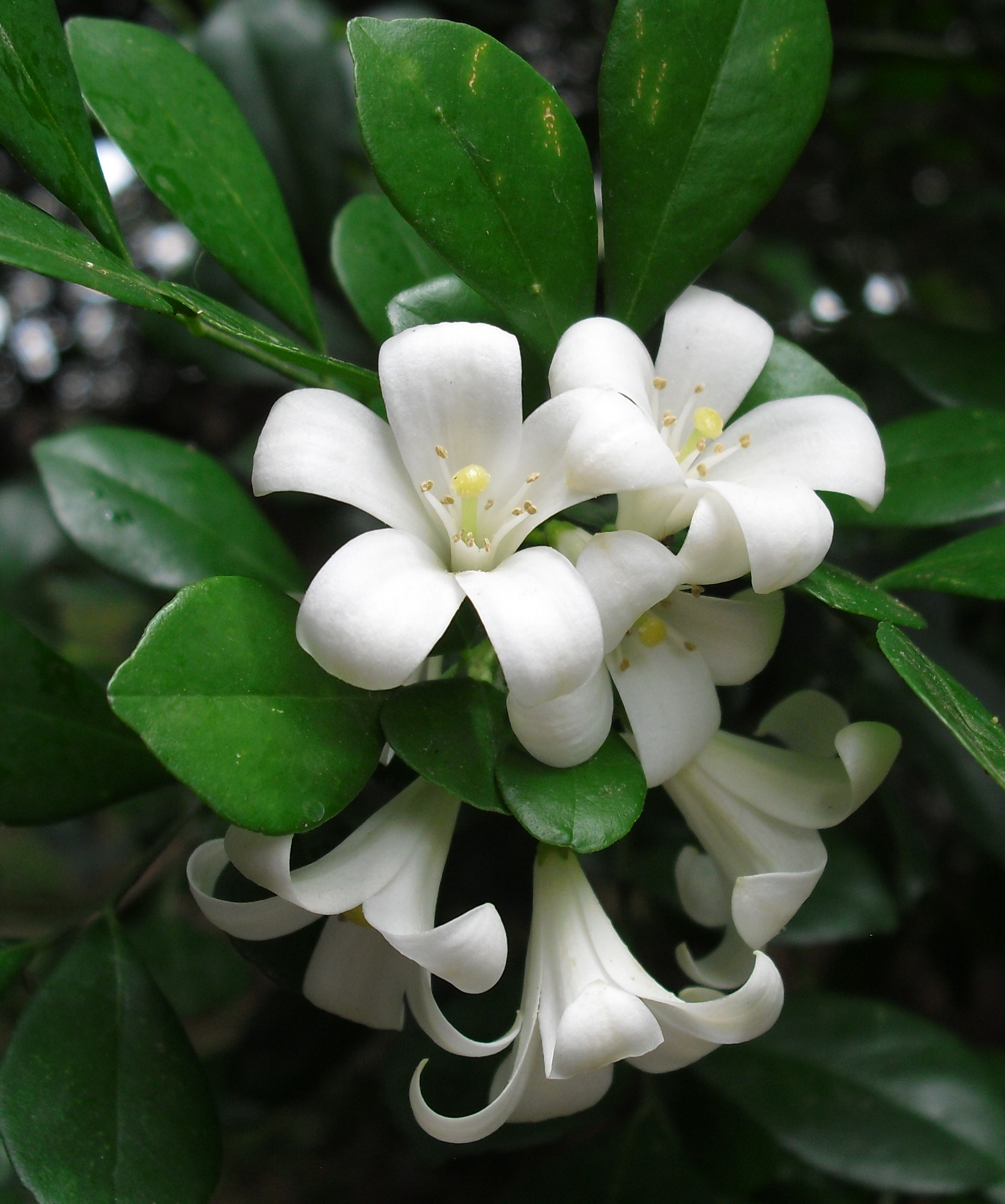
- Murraya paniculata

Scientific classification
- Kingdom: Plantae
- Clade: Tracheophytes
- Clade: Angiosperms
- Clade: Eudicots
- Clade: Rosids
- Order: Sapindales
- Family: Rutaceae
- Subfamily: Aurantioideae
- Genus: Murraya; J.Koenig ex L.

Species
- See text

Synonyms
- Camunium Adans.; Chalcas L. nom. illeg., nom. superfl.; Murraea J.Koenig ex L. orth. var.

= Murraya =

Genus of flowering plants

Murraya (/ˈmʌriə/) is a genus of flowering plants in the citrus family, Rutaceae. It is distributed in Asia, Australia, and the Pacific Islands. The center of diversity is in southern China and Southeast Asia. When broadly circumscribed, the genus has about 17 species. A narrower circumscription contains only eight species, others being placed in Bergera and Merrillia.

== Description ==
Plants in the genus Murraya are shrubs or trees with pinnate leaves arranged alternately, usually glandular, aromatic, and leathery to membranous in texture. The leaflets vary in shape and have smooth or toothed edges. The inflorescence is a panicle, cyme, or small raceme of flowers growing at the ends of branches or in the leaf axils; some flowers are solitary. The fragrant flowers have 4 or 5 sepals and white petals and up to 10 straight stamens. The fruit is a fleshy berry with pulp but without the juice vesicles present in some related fruits. It is up to 1.3 centimetres (0.51 in) long and orange, red, or black.

== Taxonomy ==
The genus Murraya was first formally described in 1771 by Carl Linnaeus in Mantissa Plantarum Altera from an unpublished description by Johann Gerhard König. The genus name commemorates the 18th-century German-Swedish herbal doctor Johan Andreas Murray, a student of Linnaeus. In 1986, Paul P.-H. But and co-authors separated off some species of Murraya as M. sect. Bergera based on chemical evidence. Evidence from pollen morphology and multiple molecular phylogenetic studies showed that when broadly circumscribed, Murraya was not monophyletic, and treating M. sect. Bergera as the separate genus Bergera has widespread support.

Murraya is in the subfamily Aurantioideae, which also includes the genus Citrus. It is in the tribe Clauseneae.

=== Species list ===
Studies have repeatedly shown that two sections into which Murraya has been divided, M. sect. Murraya and M. sect. Bergera, should be treated as separate genera. Murraya sensu stricto was revised in 2021, with eight species being accepted:

- Murraya alata Drake – China Southeast, Hainan, Vietnam
- Murraya elongata A.DC. ex Hook.f. – Myanmar
- Murraya glenieii Thwaites ex Oliv. – Sri Lanka
- Murraya lucida (G.Forst.) Mabb. – Vanuatu
- Murraya omphalocarpa Hayata
- Murraya paniculata (L.) Jack – Tropical Asia to Vanuatu and Australia
- Murraya sumatrana Roxb.
- Murraya zollingeri (Tanaka) F.J.Mou

Species that have been placed in Murraya sect. Bergera belong in Bergera, although as of September 2021, names for many have not been published. Further species still accepted in Murraya by Plants of the World Online are:

- Murraya caloxylon Ridl. – Malayasia, Thailand; synonym of Merrillia caloxylon
- Murraya crenulata (Turcz.) Oliv. – Taiwan (Lan Yü) to Malesia and SW. Pacific; placed in M. sect. Bergera
- Murraya cyclopensis Astuti & Rugayah – W. New Guinea
- Murraya euchrestifolia Hayata – China South-Central, China Southeast, Hainan, Taiwan; placed in M. sect. Bergera
- Murraya exotica L. – China South-Central, China Southeast, Hainan, Taiwan
- Murraya glabra (Guillaumin) Swingle – Vietnam
- Murraya heptaphylla Span. – Lesser Sunda Islands (Timor)
- Murraya koenigii (L.) Spreng. – Indian Subcontinent to China (S. Yunnan, Guangdong) and Indo-China, S. Hainan; synonym of Bergera koenigii
- Murraya kwangsiensis (C.C.Huang) C.C.Huang – China (SE. Yunnan, W. & SW. Guangxi); placed in M. sect. Bergera
- Murraya macrophylla (C.C.Huang) F.J.Mou & D.X.Zhang – China
- Murraya microphylla (Merr. & Chun) Swingle – China (Guangdong), Hainan; placed in M. sect. Bergera
- Murraya tetramera C.C.Huang – China (SE. Yunnan, W. Guangxi); placed in M. sect. Bergera

== Uses ==
Murraya species are used in landscaping. Some species can be grafted onto citrus rootstocks. Species have been used in traditional medicine, with various parts of the plants used to treat fever, pain, and dysentery. M. paniculata has been used to induce labor. It has been used in Cuba for painful inflammatory conditions.

In Myanmar, Murraya species are used to make thanaka, a cosmetic paste that is typically applied onto the face.

== Chemistry ==
Compounds isolated from Murraya include many types of coumarins and alkaloids. The novel alkaloid yuehchukene was found in M. paniculata, and it has since been isolated from other Murraya. It is found in red-fruited species with larger petals, but not in black-fruited species with smaller petals. Some species also contain the carbazole girinimbine.

== Spelling competition ==
In July 2021, 14-year old Zaila Avant-garde of Harvey, Louisiana, won the final of the 2021 Scripps National Spelling Bee by correctly spelling the word "Murraya", and was the first African American to win the 96-year-old event.
