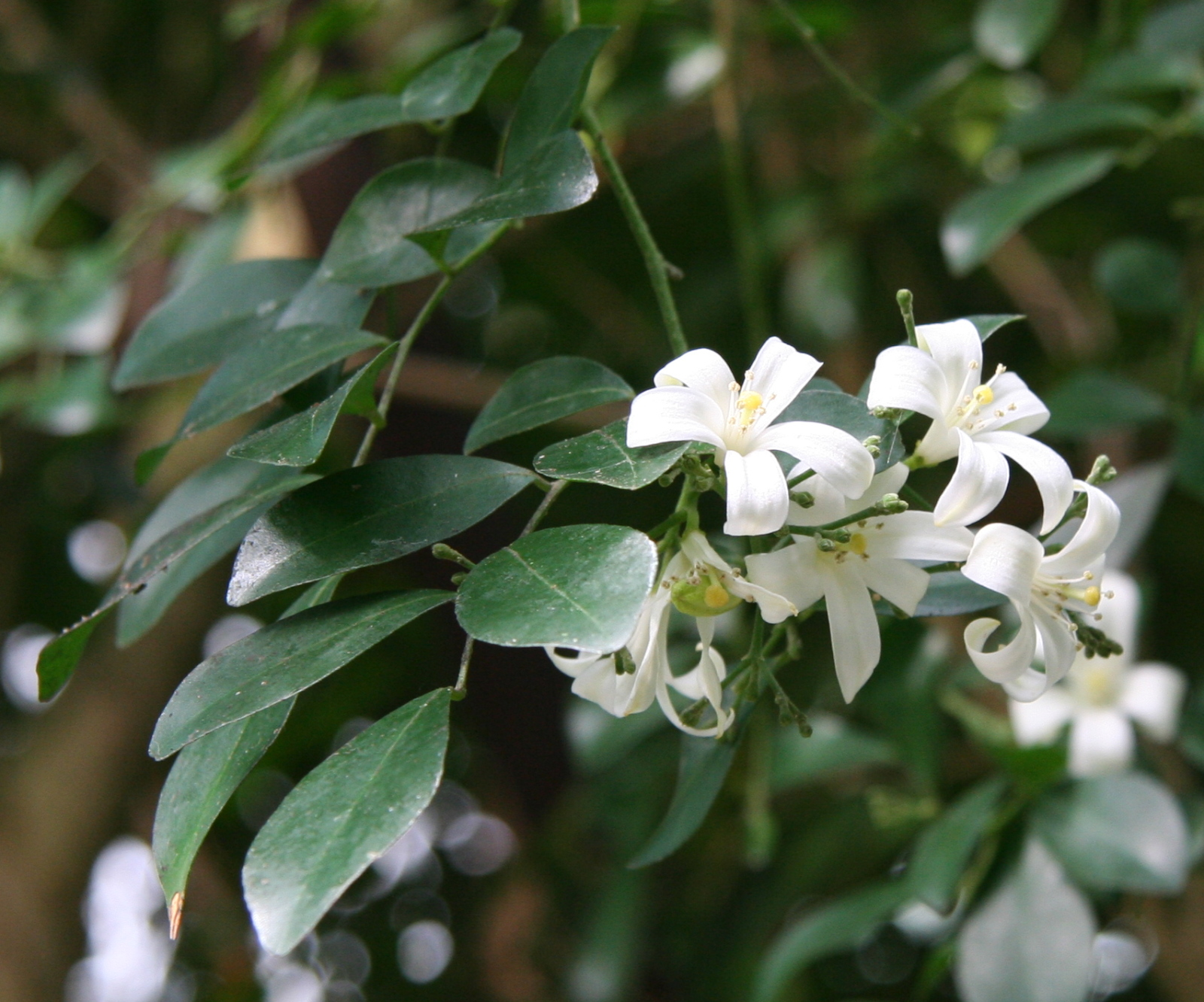
- Foliage and flowers

Scientific classification
- Kingdom: Plantae
- Clade: Tracheophytes
- Clade: Angiosperms
- Clade: Eudicots
- Clade: Rosids
- Order: Sapindales
- Family: Rutaceae
- Genus: Murraya
- Species: M. paniculata

Binomial name
- Murraya paniculata (L.) Jack

Synonyms
- 17 synonyms: Chalcas paniculata L.; Murraya exotica var. paniculata (L.) Thwaites; Connarus foetens Blanco; Connarus santaloides Blanco; Camunium exoticum (L.) Kuntze; Camunium exoticum var. pubescens Kuntze; Chalcas exotica (L.) Millsp.; Chalcas japanensis Lour.; Limonia malliculensis J.R.Forst. ex Steud.; Marsana buxifolia Sonn.; Murraya amoena Salisb.; Murraya exotica L.; Murraya exotica var. buxifolia Thwaites; Murraya japonensis (Lour.) Raeusch.; Murraya paniculata var. buxifolia (Sonn.) Thwaites; Murraya paniculata var. exotica (L.) C.C.Huang; Murraya scandens Hassk.

= Murraya paniculata =

Orange jasmine

Species of plant

Murraya paniculata, commonly known as orange jasmine, orange jessamine, china box, cosmetic barktree, or mock orange, is a species of shrub or small tree in the family Rutaceae and is native to South Asia, Southeast Asia and Australia. It has smooth bark, pinnate leaves with up to seven egg-shaped to elliptical leaflets, fragrant white or cream-coloured flowers and oval, orange-red berries containing hairy seeds.

== Description ==
Murraya paniculata is a tree that typically grows to a height of 7 m (23 ft) but often flowers and forms fruit as a shrub, and has smooth pale to whitish bark. It has pinnate leaves up to 17 cm (6.7 in) long with up to seven egg-shaped to elliptical or rhombus-shaped. The leaflets are glossy green and glabrous, 2.5–10 cm (1–4 in) long and 12–50 mm (0.5–2.0 in) wide on a petiolule 2–6 mm (0.08–0.24 in) long.

The flowers are fragrant and are arranged in loose groups, each flower on a pedicel about 1.5 mm (0.06 in) long. There are five (sometimes four) sepals about 1 mm (0.04 in) long and five (sometimes four) white or cream-coloured petals 13–18 mm (0.5–0.7 in) long. and the fruit is an oval, glabrous, orange-red berry 12–14 mm (0.47–0.55 in) long containing densely hairy seeds.

=== Phenology ===
Flowering occurs from June to March in Australia, and the fruit ripen between January and October. In the northern hemisphere flowering occurs from April to October and fruit ripen from April to February.

== Taxonomy ==
This species was first described and illustrated by Georg Eberhard Rumphius in the latter half of the 17th century during his time in what was then known as the Dutch East Indies, and published posthumously in 1747. However the first formal description was produced in 1767 by the Swedish botanist Carl Linnaeus who gave it the name Chalcas paniculata and published it in his book Mantissa Plantarum, which is an appendix to the 12th edition of his earlier work Systema Naturae. In 1820 the Scottish botanist William Jack changed the name to Murraya paniculata in his book Descriptions of Malayan Plants [Malayan Miscellanies].

== Distribution and habitat ==
Murraya paniculata grows in rainforest, often as an understorey shrub in vine thickets, including behind beaches. It is native to South and Southeast Asia, China and Australasia, while the distribution area extends from Pakistan via India, Sri Lanka and southern China to Taiwan, the Philippines, where it is called kamuníng, the Ryūkyū Islands and the Mariana Islands, to the south via Malaysia and Indonesia to New Guinea and parts of Australia. In Australia, it is native to the Kimberley region of Western Australia, northern parts of the Northern Territory, and parts of Queensland. The species has been naturalised in other places, sometimes becoming an invasive weed, including on many Pacific islands. In Queensland, it is regarded as different from the cultivated form Murraya paniculata 'Exotica', which is regarded as one of the most invasive plant species in southeast Queensland.

== Cultivation ==
Murraya paniculata is cultivated as an ornamental tree or hedge because of its hardiness, wide range of soil tolerance (M. paniculata may grow in alkaline, clayey, sandy, acidic and loamy soils), and is suitable for larger hedges. The plant flowers throughout the year and produces small, fragrant flower clusters which attract bees, while the fruits attract small frugivorous birds.

=== Propagation ===
The orange jessamine is sexually propagated by its seeds. The fruits are eaten by birds, which then pass the seeds out in their feces. It may also be asexually propagated by softwood cuttings.

== Ecology ==
This species is one of the preferred hosts of the citrus pest Diaphorina citri, the citrus psyllid, which is the vector for the Citrus greening disease.

=== Diseases ===
M. paniculata is vulnerable to soil nematodes, scales, sooty mold and whiteflies.

== Gallery ==
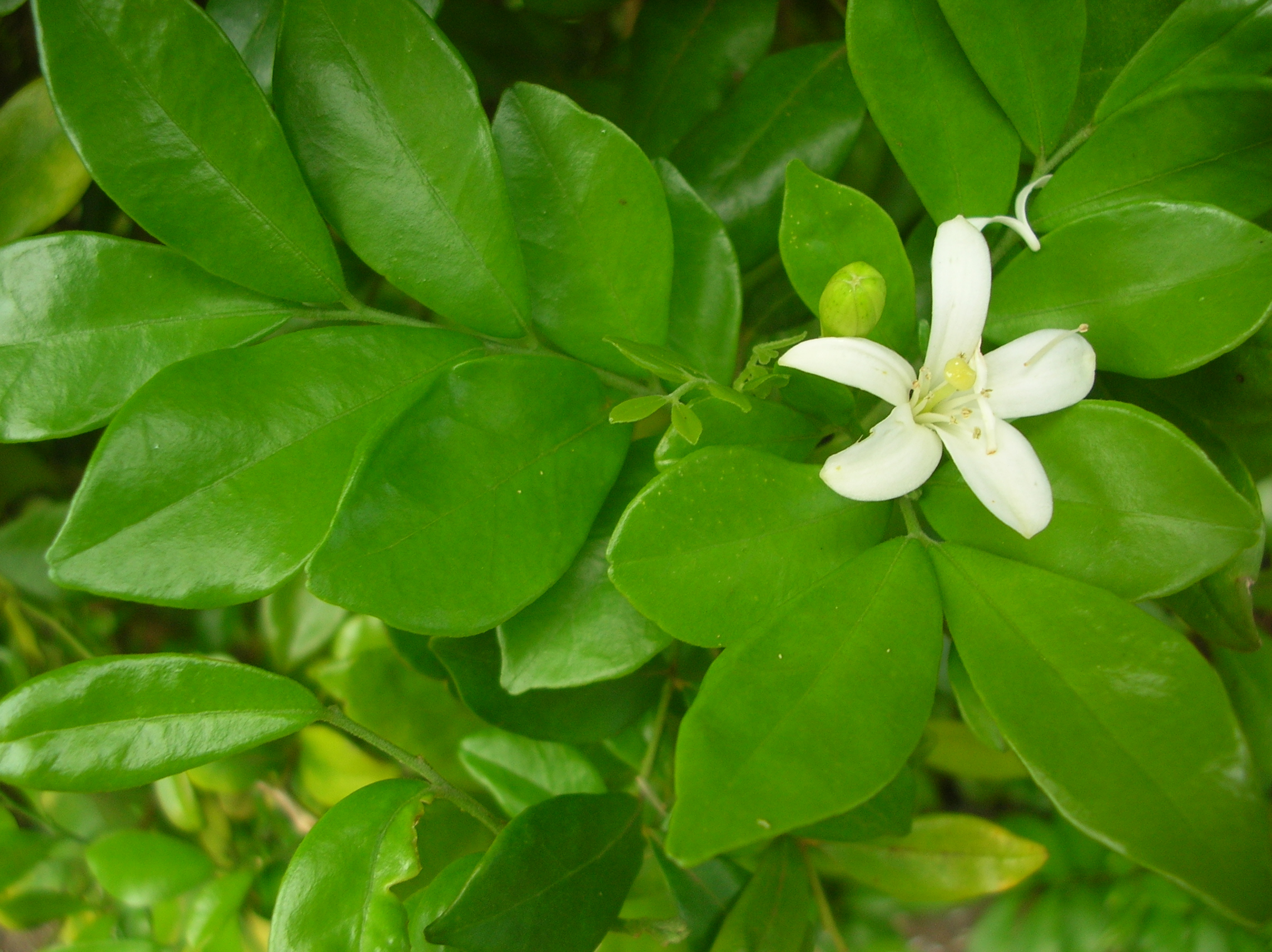
Flowers and leaves

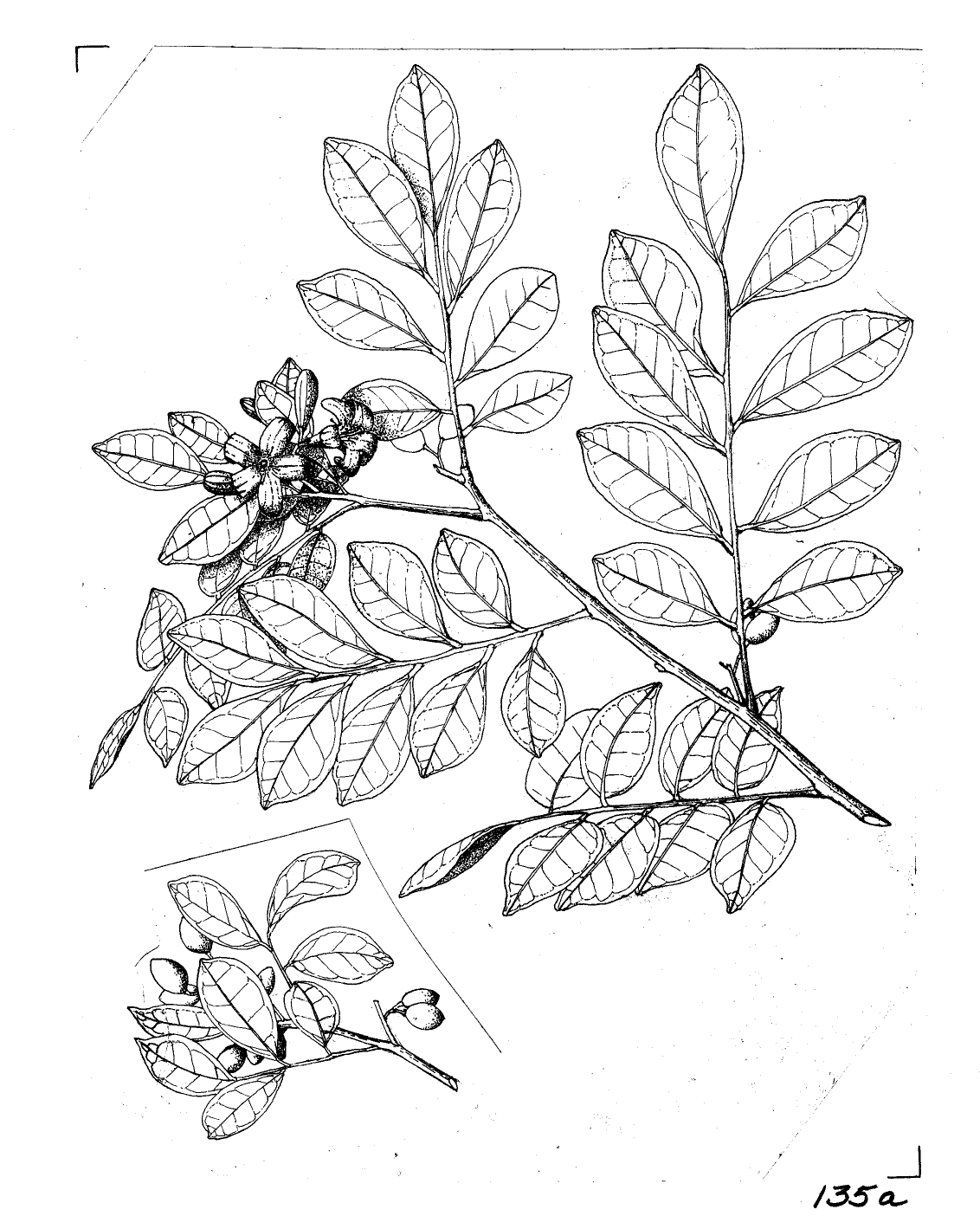
Line drawing showing flowers and fruit

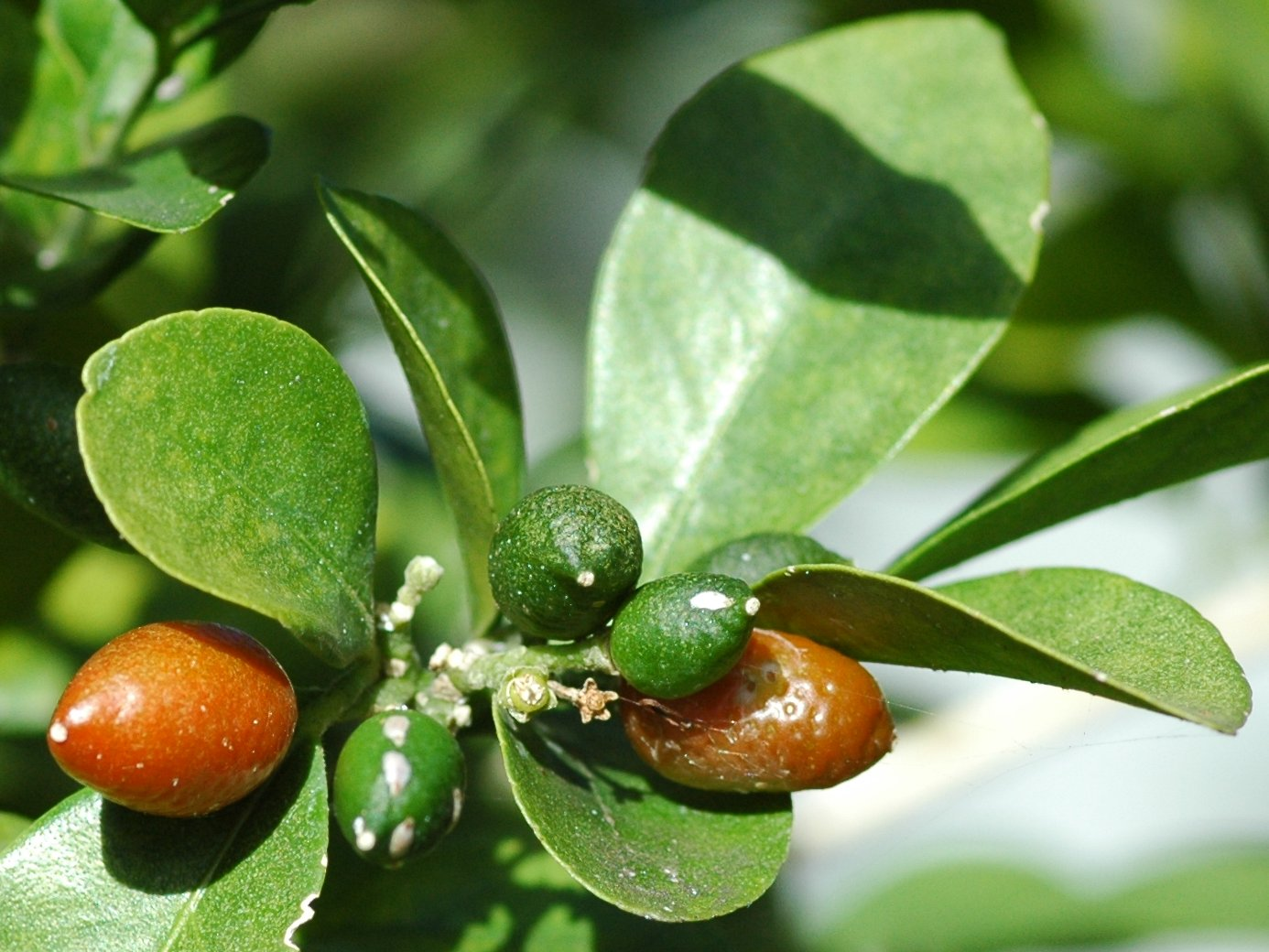
Fruits

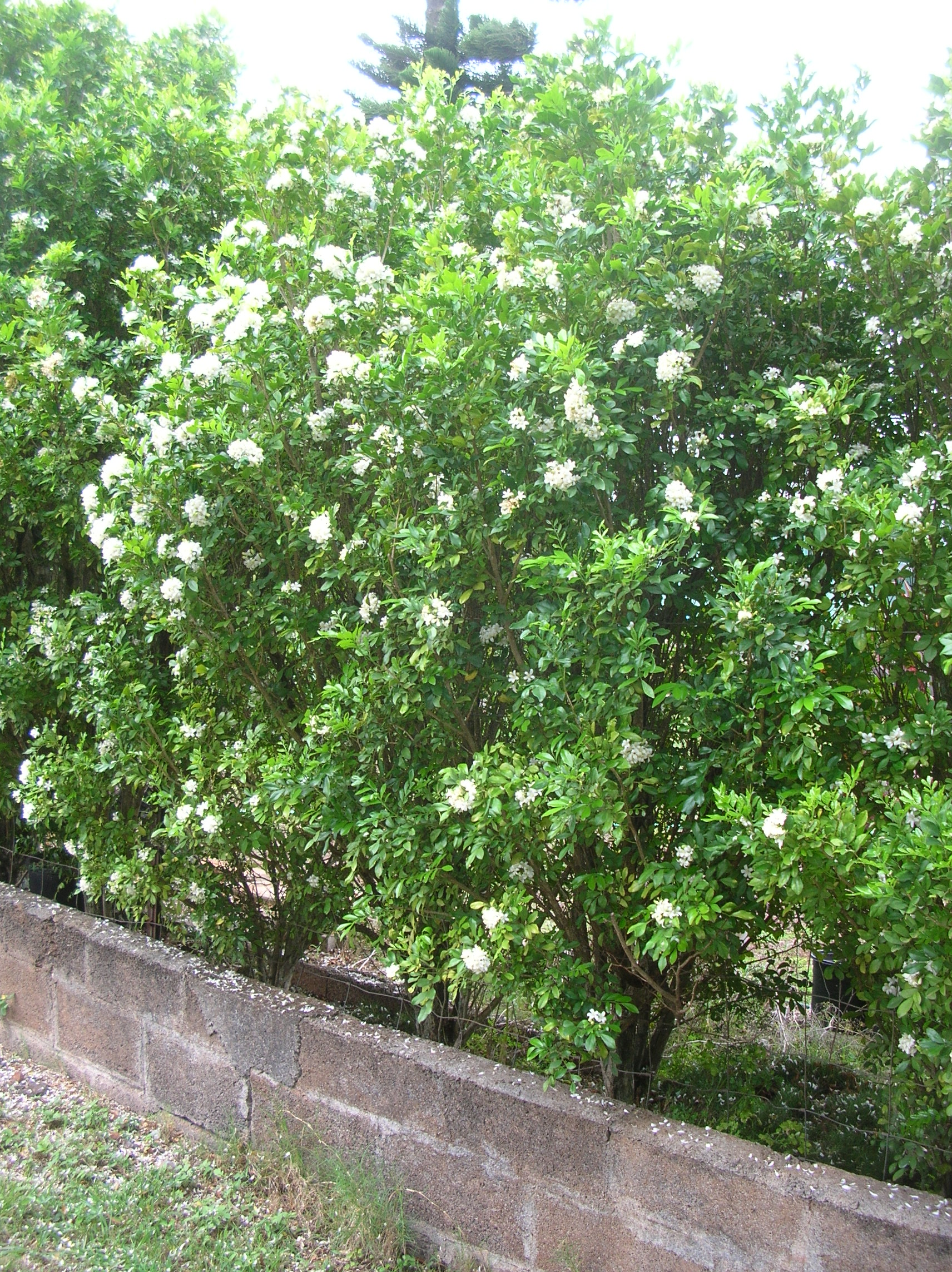
Shrubby formation in cultivation

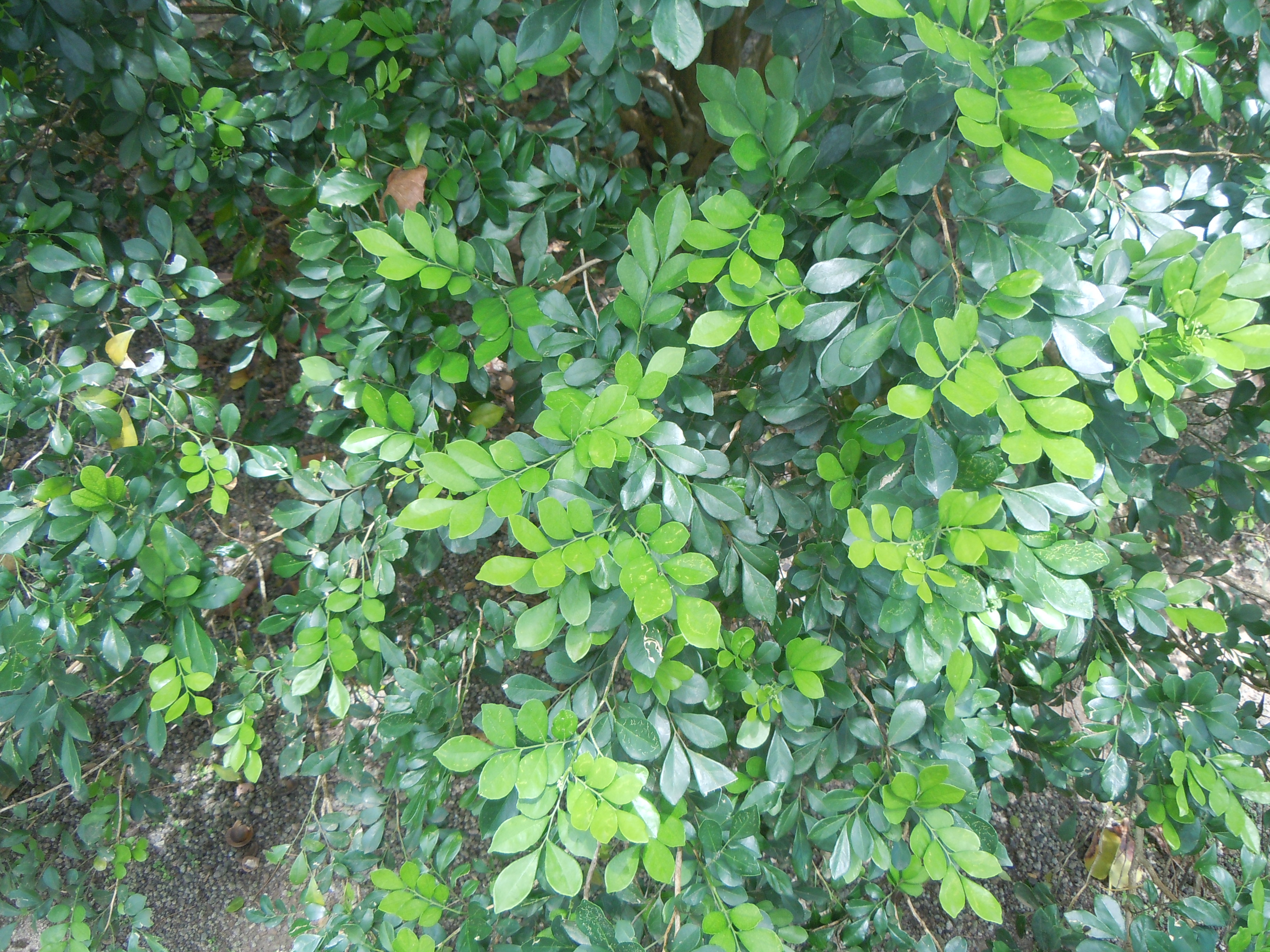
Foliage

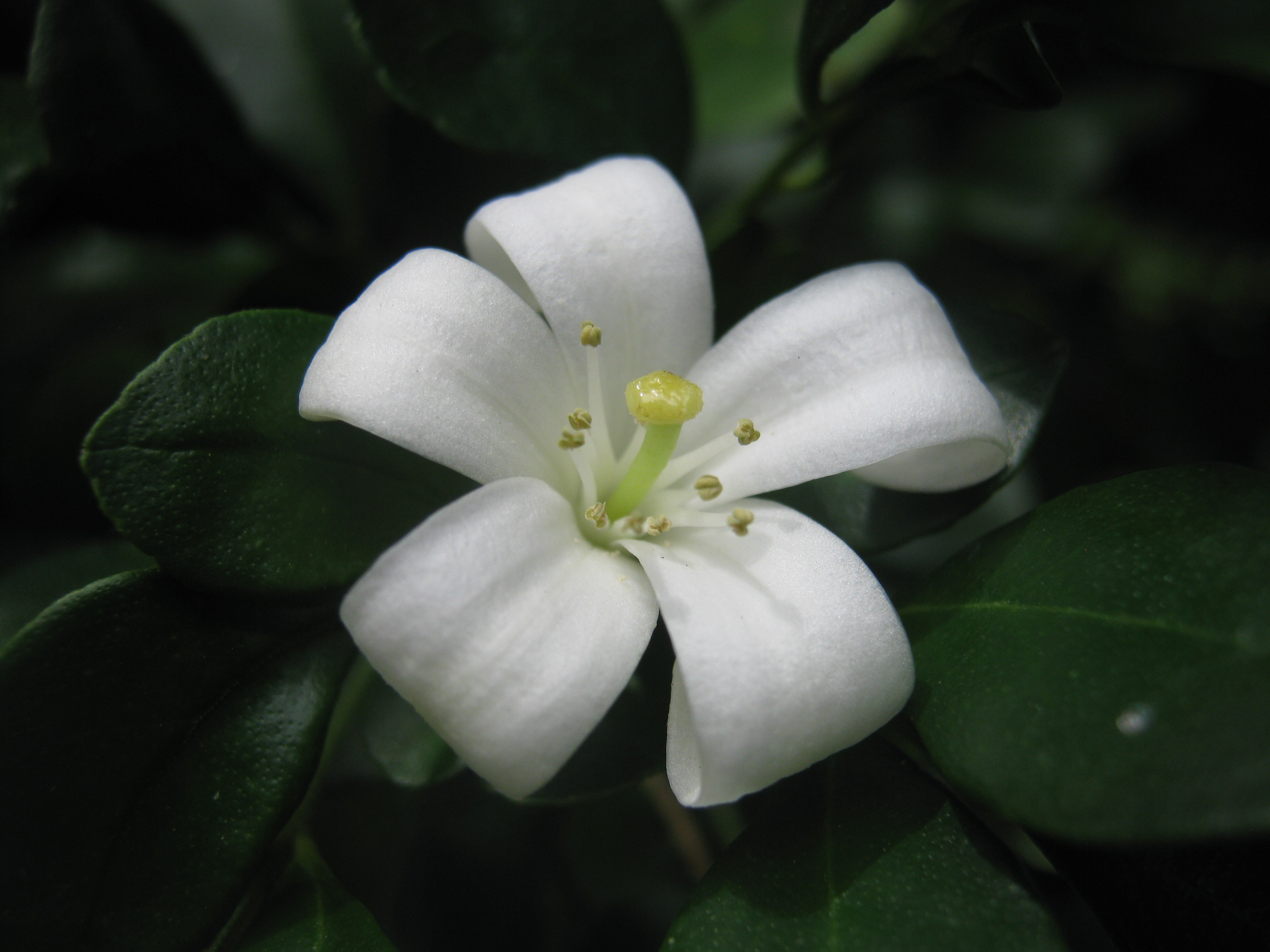
Flower detail

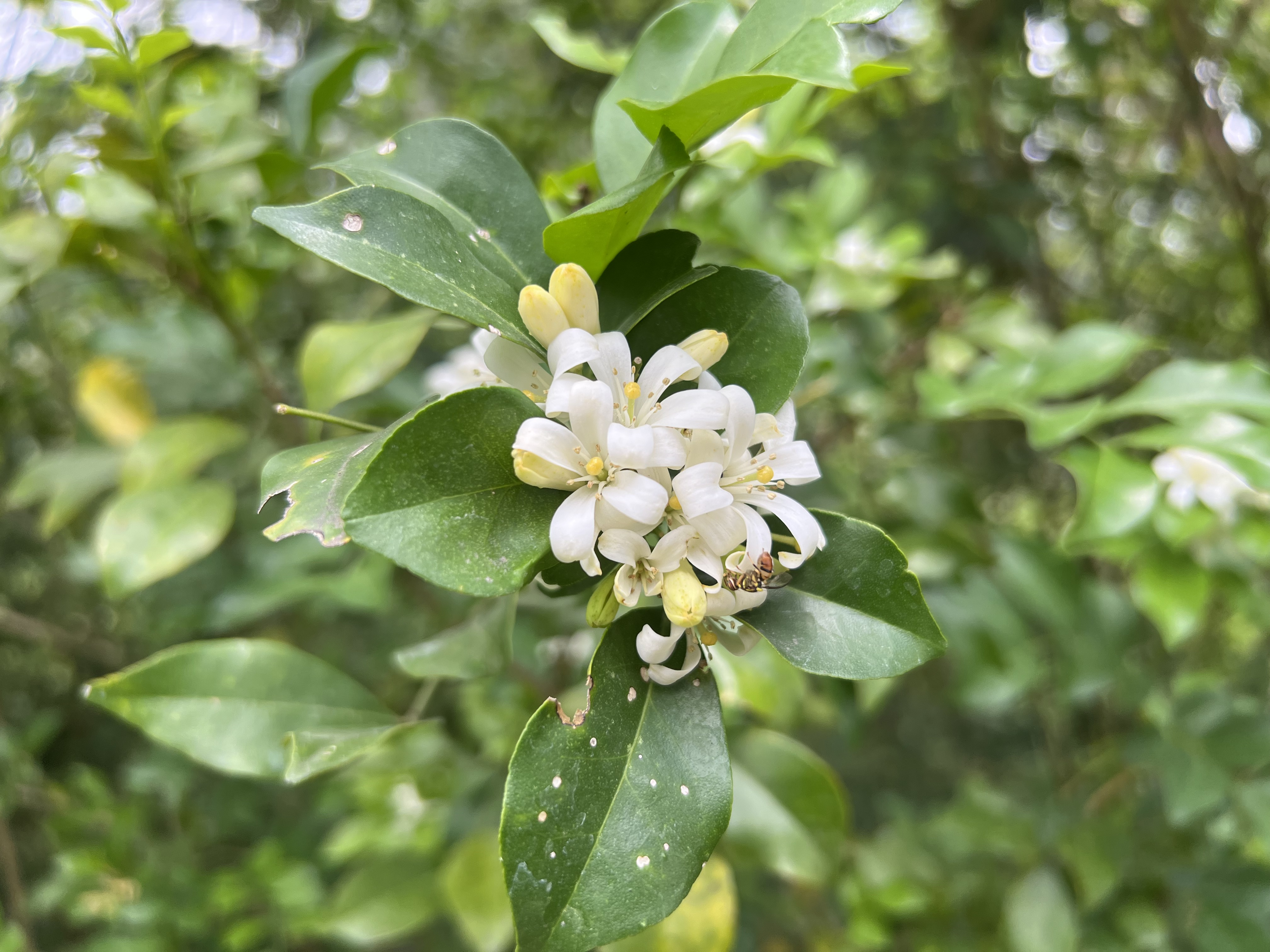
Flowers and foliage, with a pollinating bee
