= Mulberry Park (Guangdong) =

Tourist attraction

- Type: Sightseeing; education; entertainment
- Location: Huadu District, Guangzhou City, Guangdong Province, China
- Area: 132 acres

Mulberry Park (Guangdong), located in Huadu District of Guangzhou City, Guangdong Province, China, is a tourist attraction which was set up in 2007 with registered capital of one million yuan. It is an exclusively-invested enterprise set and managed by The Institute of Guangdong Academy of Agricultural Sciences, which focuses on agricultural processing, sericulture, and mulberry culture. And it is the first new ecotourism demonstration base in China.

== Sericulture ==
Originating in China, sericulture refers to the rearing of silkworms to produce silk and it has a history of more than 5000 years. It has become a kind of cottage industry in several countries, and China and India are the most important producers.

== Mulberries ==
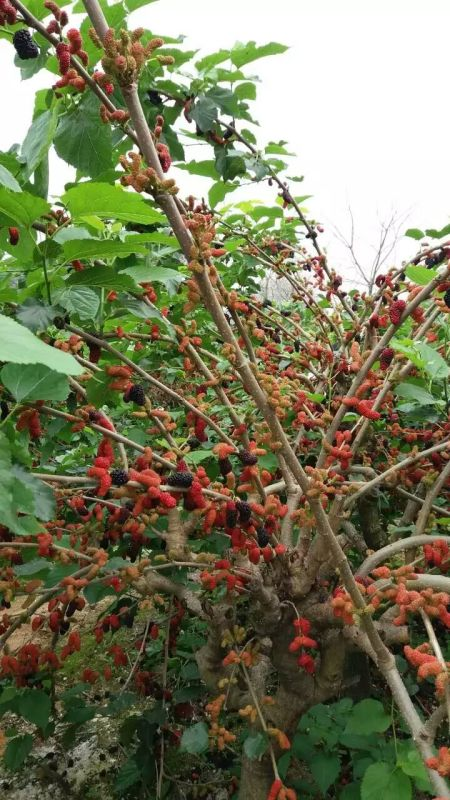
the mulberry trees in the Mulberry Park in Guangzhou, Guangdong, China

The Mulberry Park occupies about 132 acres in total with a large area of mulberry forests. The mulberry is regarded as the “traditional holly fruit” for its purity and great values. It contains rich vitamins, amino acid, carotene, minerals, and so on. The nutrition of mulberries is about five times more than that of apples and three times more than that of grapes. Generally, It is time for harvest when the mulberries turn magenta in the period from April to June.

== Amenities and activities ==
=== Sightseeing spots ===
==== Museum ====
With two core concepts of growing mulberries and breeding silkworm, the museum presents the history and culture of silkworm and mulberries, the entire life of silkworm, and the fish ponds with mulberry trees. It also introduces the new production of modern silkworm and mulberry sources after comprehensive utilization and processing.

==== Silkworm Babies Entertainment Park ====
It displays silkworm babies of different ages, relative biological knowledge, and the functions of silkworm cocoon. Tourists are allowed to interact with the silkworm.

==== The “Strange Vegetables Veranda” ====
In the "Strange Vegetables Veranda", there are several kinds of vegetables in different colors and in very big size, such as huge orange pumpkins and green winter melons.

=== Entertainment ===
==== Fruit picking ====
Spring (March–May) is the season for picking mulberries. Early summer (June–July) is suitable for picking muskmelons and midsummer (July–August) is good for picking longan and wampee. Autumn (September–November) is for picking grapes and mulberries, and winter (December–February) is for picking cherry tomatoes. Tourists can also buy their favorite fruits after tasting. And some special festivals like the Mulberry Festival is held in spring annually when tourists can eat mulberries as many as they like.

==== Parents-child campaigns ====
Parents-child campaigns are offered to the tourists, namely, the tug-of- war competition, tandem riding, boating, mobile games, and so on.

==== 5 D films ====
A mini cinema is built in the Mulberry Park, where the audience can gain special experiences when watching 5D movies. As the plots of the movies change, corresponding events like rain and thunder would take place in the cinema.

=== Dining ===
==== The Health Care Restaurant ====
The nutritious dishes in the restaurant are all made of the special ingredients from the park. Some characteristic dishes are as the followings: fried mulberry leaves tea, mulberry leaves and crucian carp soup, mulberry leaves and pig bones soup, fried mulberry leaves with egg, fried mulberry leaves with meat balls, deep-fried silkworms, and so on.

==== Barbecue ====
There is a specific area for having barbecue or a picnic. Tourists are expected to reserve their tables in advance if they need.

=== Other services ===
In the souvenir shop, there are a wide range of products about mulberries, silk, and silkworms, including mulberry juice, mulberry tea, mulberry wine, and so on.

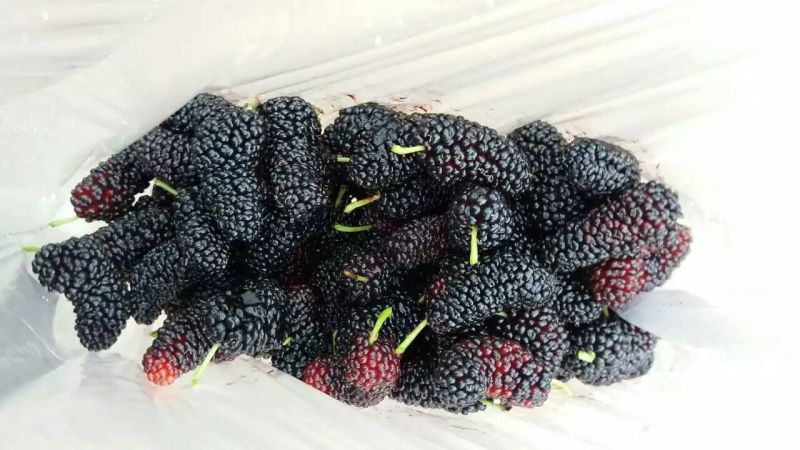
the mulberries picked from the Mulberry Park in Guangzhou, Guangdong, China

== Honors ==
“Guangdong Scientific Education Base”, “Silkworm Culture Demonstration Base”, “Ecotourism Starred Park”, “Sightseeing Demonstration Park”.

== Address ==
Shanqian Venue, Changang Village, Chini County, Huadu District, Guangzhou City, Guangdong Province, China.
