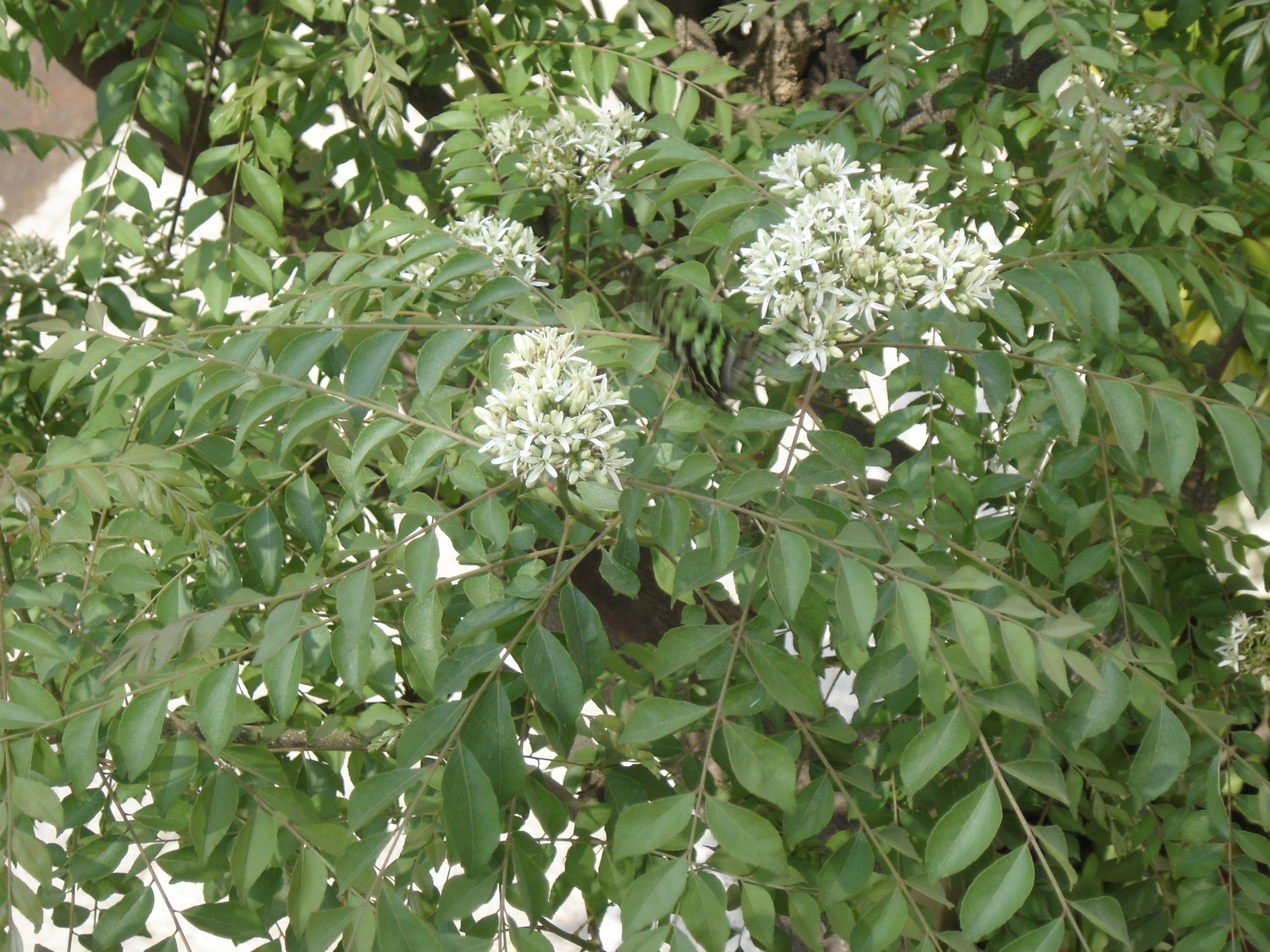
- Leaves and flowers of Bergera koenigii

Scientific classification
- Kingdom: Plantae
- Clade: Tracheophytes
- Clade: Angiosperms
- Clade: Eudicots
- Clade: Rosids
- Order: Sapindales
- Family: Rutaceae
- Subfamily: Aurantioideae
- Genus: Bergera; J.Koenig

Species
- See text.

Synonyms
- Nimbo Dennst.

= Bergera =

Flowering plants in the family Rutaceae

Bergera is a genus of flowering plants in the family Rutaceae. It has been included in Murraya as M. sect. Bergera. Species that may be placed in the genus are native from India through southeast Asia eastwards to China and Taiwan southwards to Malesia and New Caledonia. The curry tree, Bergera koenigii, is one of the better known species.

== Taxonomy ==
The genus name Bergera was first published by Johann Gerhard König in 1771. Bergera was then accepted as a separate genus for several decades after König's description, but was later united with the genus Murraya, (for which Bergera had been rejected as a name,). In 1986, Paul P.-H. But and co-authors separated off some species of Murraya as M. sect. Bergera based on chemical evidence. The later creation of a separate genus for the section was further supported by evidence from pollen morphology in 2009, and molecular phylogenetic evidence in 2017. The genus is accepted in a 2021 classification of the family Rutaceae, which was based on a major molecular phylogenetic study of the family.

=== Species ===
Plants of the World Online originally only accepted one species, B. koenigii, with others placed in a section of genus Murraya. As of March 2026, it includes:

1. Bergera alternifolia (Kurz) F.J.Mou
2. Bergera crenulata (Turcz.) F.J.Mou
3. Bergera euchrestifolia (Hayata) F.J.Mou
4. Bergera glabra (Guillaumin) F.J.Mou
5. Bergera koenigii L.
6. Bergera kwangsiensis (C.C.Huang) F.J.Mou
7. Bergera macrophylla (C.C.Huang) F.J.Mou
8. Bergera microphylla (Merr. & Chun) F.J.Mou
9. Bergera stenocarpa (Drake) F.J.Mou
10. Bergera tetramera (C.C.Huang) F.J.Mou
11. Bergera unifolia C.L.Deng & F.J.Mou

Species have also been placed in Murraya sect. Bergera including:

- Murraya crenulata (Turcz.) Oliv. - also a synonym of Clausena smyrelliana
- Murraya koenigii (L.) Spreng., - Curry tree

== Distribution ==
Species that may be placed in Bergera are native from India through southeast Asia (including China) to Taiwan, Malesia and New Caledonia.
