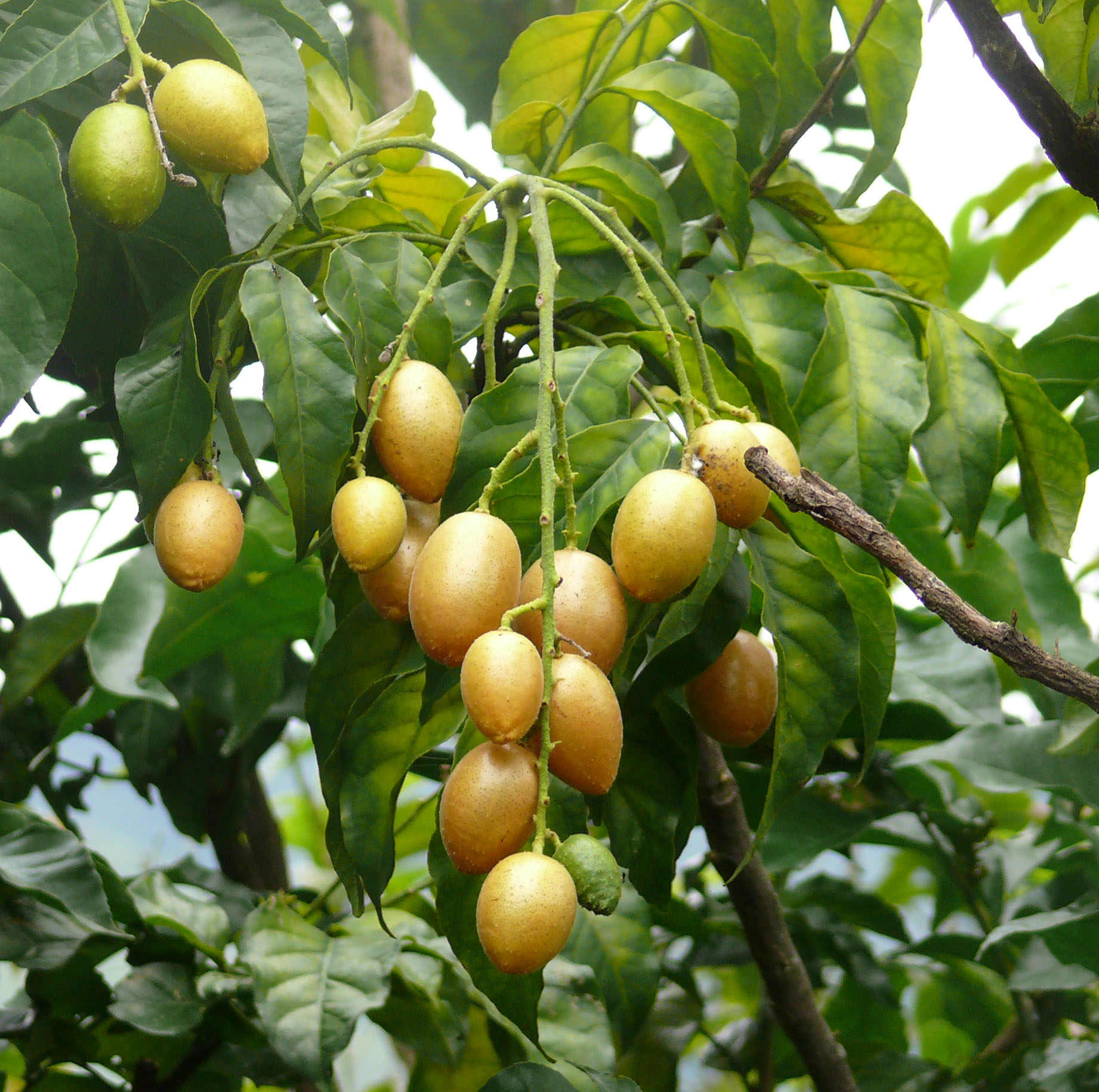
- Clausena lansium

Scientific classification
- Kingdom: Plantae
- Clade: Embryophytes
- Clade: Tracheophytes
- Clade: Angiosperms
- Clade: Eudicots
- Clade: Rosids
- Order: Sapindales
- Family: Rutaceae
- Subfamily: Aurantioideae
- Genus: Clausena; Burm.f.

Type species
- Clausena excavata Burm.f.

Synonyms
- Cookia Sonn.; Fagarastrum G.Don; Gallesioa M.Roem.; Glaucena Vitman; Myaris C.Presl; Piptostylis Dalzell; Polycyema Voigt; Quinaria Lour.

= Clausena =

Genus of flowering plants

Clausena is a genus of flowering plants in the citrus family, Rutaceae. It was first defined by the Dutch botanist Nicolaas Laurens Burman in 1768. It is distributed in Africa, southern Asia, Australia, and the Pacific Islands.

This genus is in the subfamily Aurantioideae, which also includes genus Citrus. It is in the subtribe Clauseninae, which are known technically as the remote citroid fruit trees.

Clausena was named for the Norwegian clergyman, Peder Claussøn Friis (1545-1614), the translator of the Icelandic historian and poet, Snorri Sturluson.

== Description ==
The genus includes shrubs and trees. Some species are variable, with many forms. C. anisata, for example has been described as a shrub under a meter tall and as a tree of 20 metres (66 ft). The leaves of these plants are pinnate, divided into leaflets. The inflorescence varies in form, but is generally a cluster of several flowers with 4 or 5 petals and sepals. The fruit is a berry which lacks the juice vesicles of many other fruits in the citrus family. The genus can be distinguished from related plants by the presence of a gynophore, a structure supporting the ovary in the flower. It looks very different in the various species, however, and can be hard to recognize.

== Uses ==
C. anisata is a tree used for its wood, and in traditional medicine. C. excavata is used medicinally in Asia for a variety of conditions, including snakebite, malaria, dysentery, and HIV infection. Some species, such as C. indica and C. lansium (wampi), produce edible fruit. Wampi is cultivated as a fruit tree, and though it is only a remote relative of citrus, it can be grafted to various citrus trees. There are sour, sweet, and intermediate varieties of C. lansium.

== Fossil record ==
A Clausena leaf fossil from the Oligocene of Ethiopia, represents so far the oldest record of the genus.

== Diversity ==
The taxonomy of the genus is unclear. There are between about 15 and 30 species. Many formerly used names were made synonyms in a 1994 revision.

Plants of the World Online includes:

1. Clausena agasthyamalayana E.S.S.Kumar, Shareef, P.E.Roy & Veldkamp
2. Clausena anisata (Willd.) Hook.f. ex Benth. - horsewood
3. Clausena anisum-olens (Blanco) Merr. (syn. C. sanki, nom. rejic.)
4. Clausena austroindica B.C.Stone & K.K.N.Nair
5. Clausena brevistyla Oliv.
6. Clausena emarginata C.C.Huang
7. Clausena engleri Tanaka
8. Clausena excavata Burm.f.
9. Clausena hainanensis C.C.Huang & W.F.Xing
10. Clausena harmandiana (Pierre) Guillaumin
11. Clausena henryi (Swingle) C.C.Huang
12. Clausena heptaphylla (Roxb. ex DC.) Wight & Arn.
13. Clausena indica (Dalzell) Oliv.
14. Clausena lansium (Lour.) Skeels– wampi, wampee, Chinese clausena
15. Clausena lenis Drake
16. Clausena luxurians (Kurz) Swingle
17. Clausena pentaphylla DC.
18. Clausena poilanei Molino
19. Clausena wallichii Oliv.
20. Clausena yunnanensis C.C.Huang

Note: Clausena smyrelliana is a may be a synonym of Bergera crenulata
