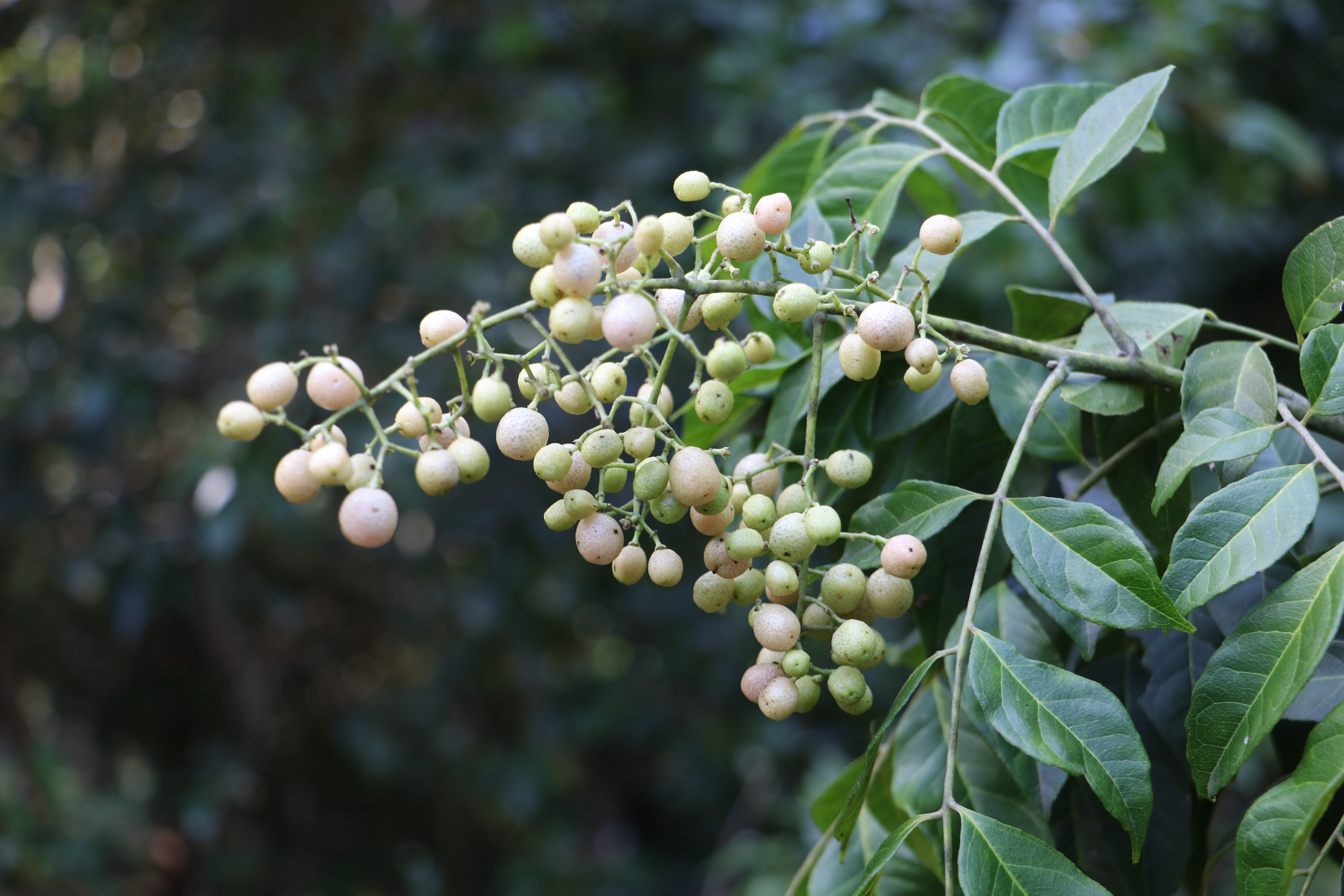

Scientific classification
- Kingdom: Plantae
- Clade: Tracheophytes
- Clade: Angiosperms
- Clade: Eudicots
- Clade: Rosids
- Order: Sapindales
- Family: Rutaceae
- Genus: Clausena
- Species: C. brevistyla

Binomial name
- Clausena brevistyla Oliv.

= Clausena brevistyla =

Species of flowering plant

Clausena brevistyla is a species of evergreen shrub to 6 m tall, in the citrus family Rutaceae. It is found in New Guinea and Queensland, Australia.
