= Clausena excavata =

Scientific classification
- Kingdom: Plantae
- Clade: Tracheophytes
- Clade: Angiosperms
- Clade: Eudicots
- Clade: Rosids
- Order: Sapindales
- Family: Rutaceae
- Genus: Clausena
- Species: C. excavata

Binomial name
- Clausena excavata Burm.f.

Synonyms
- Amyris graveolens Buch.-Ham. ex Steud.; Amyris punctata Roxb. ex Colebr.; Amyris sumatrana Roxb.; Clausena javanensis Raeusch. ex DC.; Clausena javensis J.F.Gmel.; Clausena lunulata Hayata; Clausena moningerae Merr.; Clausena punctata (Roxb.) Wight & Arn. ex Steud.; Clausena sumatrana (Roxb.) Wight & Arn. ex Steud.; Clausena tetramera Hayata; Cookia anisodora Blanco; Cookia anisum-olens Blanco; Cookia graveolens Wight & Arn.; Cookia punctata Retz.; Gallesioa graveolens M.Roem.; Lawsonia falcata Lour.

Species of flowering plant

Clausena excavata is a species of evergreen shrub that grows 1–2 metres (3 ft 3 in – 6 ft 7 in) tall, in the family Rutaceae, native to Bangladesh, Bhutan, Cambodia, China, India, Indonesia, Laos, Malaysia, Myanmar, Nepal, the Philippines, Taiwan, Thailand, and Vietnam. The plant is commonly by various names, including pink lime-berry, cama, cemama, cemamar, cerek, cerek hitam, kemantu hitam, secerek, semeru, and suntang hitam.

== Uses ==
The leaves are used in Southeast Asian cooking, emitting a curry-like smell when crushed. The plant's berries are also edible and have an anise flavour. The plant is astringent, bitter, emmenagogue and considered a tonic for digestive problems.

One of the phytochemicals the plant contains is lichexanthone.
