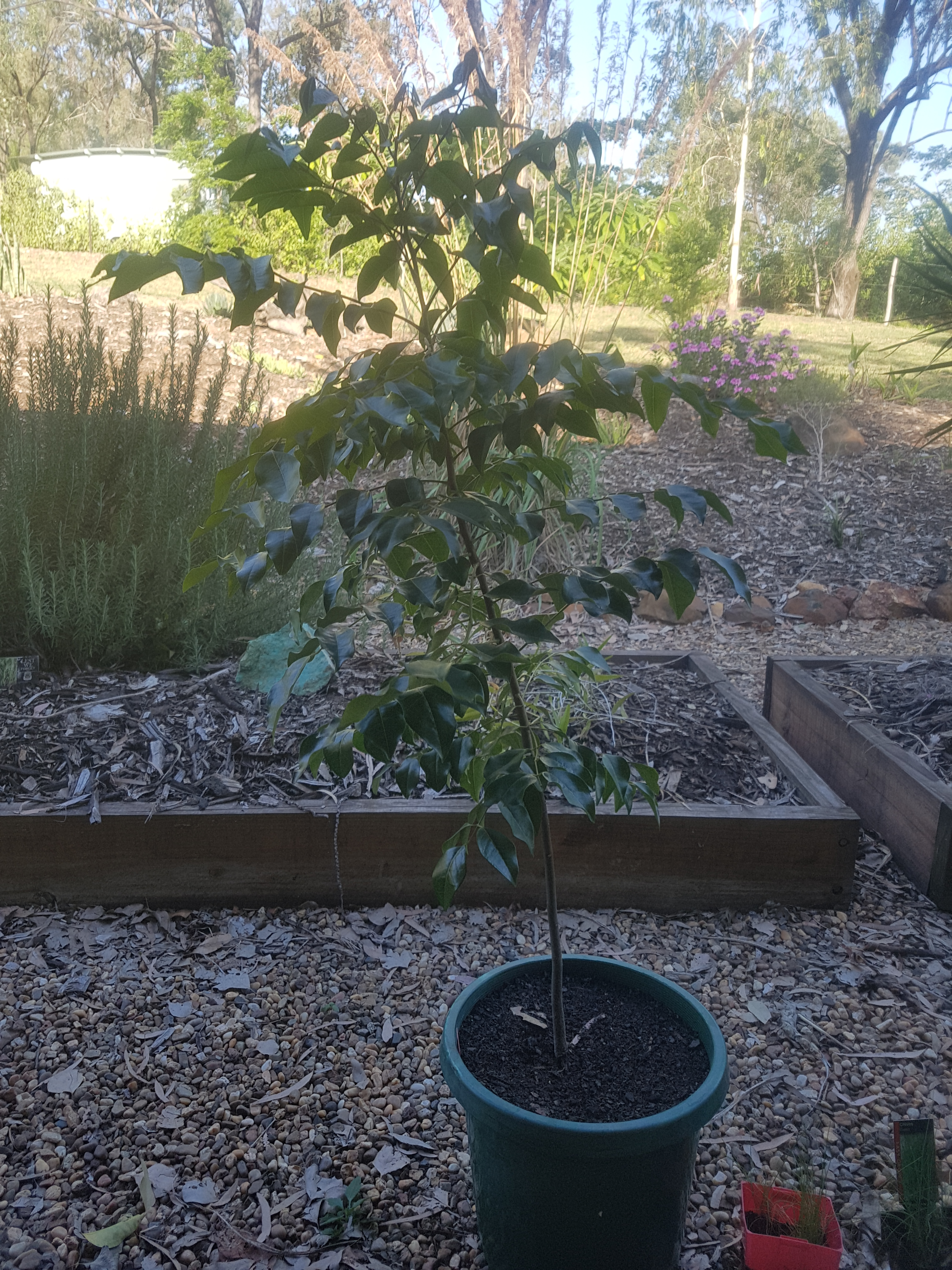
- Young Clausena smyrelliana

Scientific classification
- Kingdom: Plantae
- Clade: Tracheophytes
- Clade: Angiosperms
- Clade: Eudicots
- Clade: Rosids
- Order: Sapindales
- Family: Rutaceae
- Genus: Clausena
- Species: C. smyrelliana

Binomial name
- Clausena smyrelliana P.I.Forst.

= Clausena smyrelliana =

Species of flowering plant

Clausena smyrelliana, commonly known as Smyrell's clausena or Gregs wampi, is a species of evergreen shrub to 6 m tall, in the family Rutaceae, native to eastern Australia.
