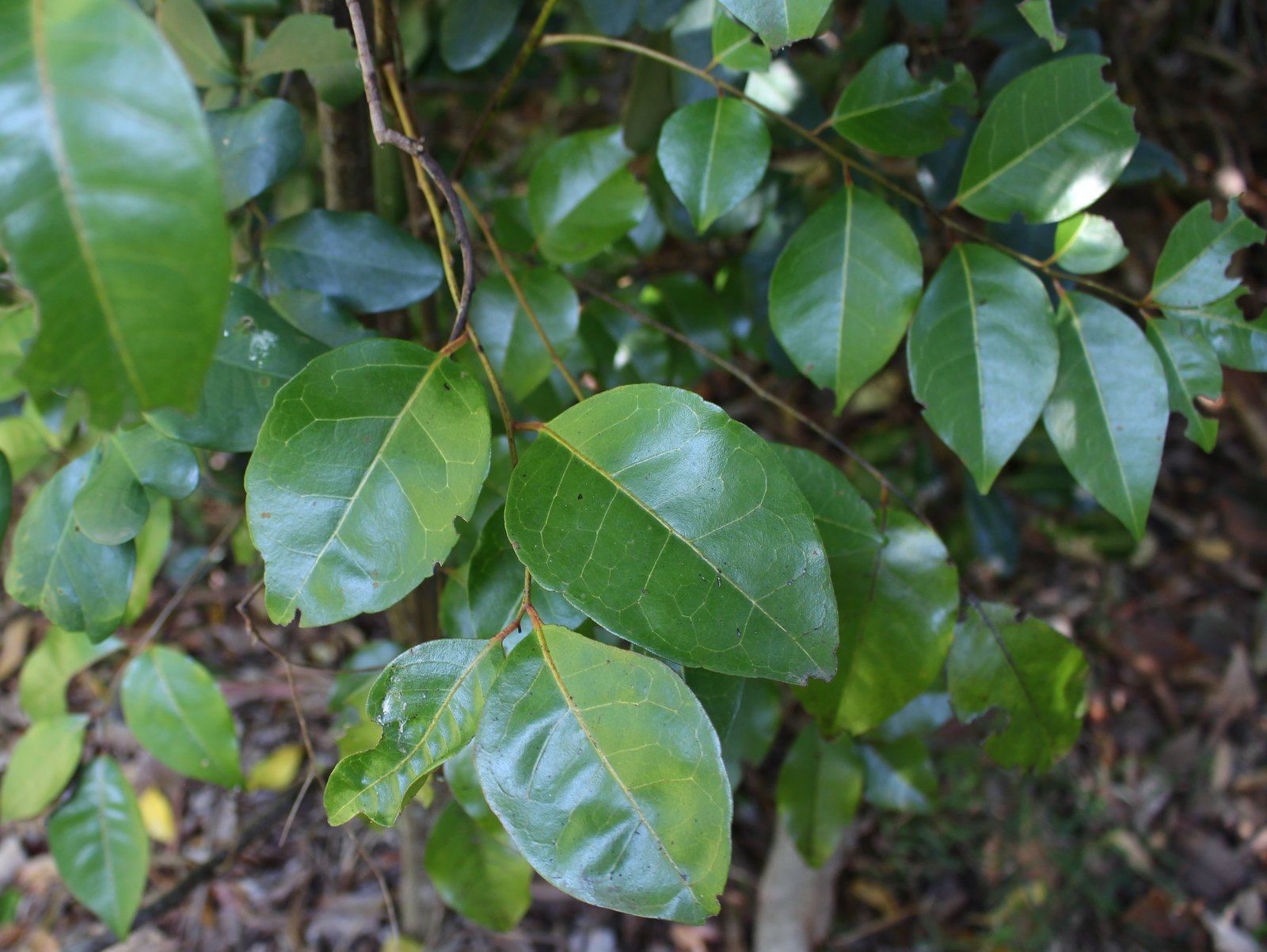

Scientific classification
- Kingdom: Plantae
- Clade: Embryophytes
- Clade: Tracheophytes
- Clade: Spermatophytes
- Clade: Angiosperms
- Clade: Eudicots
- Clade: Rosids
- Order: Sapindales
- Family: Rutaceae
- Genus: Murraya
- Species: M. crenulata

Binomial name
- Murraya crenulata (Turcz.) Oliv.

Synonyms
- Glycosmis crenulata Turcz.; Chalcas crenulata (Turcz.) Tanaka

= Murraya crenulata =

Species of flowering plant

Murraya crenulata is a species of shrub or small tree in the family Rutaceae. Found in Taiwan, Indonesia, Philippines, Papua New Guinea and south western Pacific islands. In Queensland, Australia the species is listed as endangered.
