= Yuehchukene =

Names
- Preferred IUPAC name (6S,6aS,10aR)-6-(1H-Indol-3-yl)-7,7,9-trimethyl-5,6,6a,7,8,10a-hexahydroindeno[2,1-b]indole

Identifiers
CAS Number	96624-37-2
3D model (JSmol)	Interactive image
ChemSpider	112041
PubChem CID	126009
CompTox Dashboard (EPA)	DTXSID80914414
- InChI: InChI=1S/C26H26N2/c1-15-12-18-22-17-9-5-7-11-21(17)28-25(22)23(24(18)26(2,3)13-15)19-14-27-20-10-6-4-8-16(19)20/h4-12,14,18,23-24,27-28H,13H2,1-3H3/t18-,23+,24-/m0/s1 Key: CZJCZWZKBWLSQX-GLYQVZKVSA-N; InChI=1/C26H26N2/c1-15-12-18-22-17-9-5-7-11-21(17)28-25(22)23(24(18)26(2,3)13-15)19-14-27-20-10-6-4-8-16(19)20/h4-12,14,18,23-24,27-28H,13H2,1-3H3/t18-,23+,24-/m0/s1 Key: CZJCZWZKBWLSQX-GLYQVZKVBH
- SMILES: c1cccc2c1c(c[nH]2)[C@H]6c4[nH]c3ccccc3c4[C@@H]5/C=C(/C)CC(C)(C)[C@@H]56

Properties
Chemical formula	C_{26}H_{26}N_{2}
Molar mass	366.508 g·mol^{−1}
- Except where otherwise noted, data are given for materials in their standard state (at 25 °C [77 °F], 100 kPa). Infobox references

Yuehchukene is a dimeric indole alkaloid that shows anti-fertility and estrogenic activities. Yuehchukene is isolated from the roots of plants belonging to the genus Murraya. Its natural abundance is in the range of 10-52 ppm.

Yuehchukene consists of a tetracyclic unit with a C6 indole substituent. Since its discovery no other natural product of similar structure has been found. Particularly, yuehchukene differs from other natural bis-indole alkaloids because it does not seem to be derived from tryptophan.

The steric environments of the two nitrogen atoms are very different. One nitrogen is part of a rigid ring system and is shielded by the C6 indole. The other is part of the freely rotating indole making it readily assessable and therefore more reactive.

== Biological activity ==
Interest in this compound stems from its biological activity. Yuehchukene possesses a potent anti-fertility activity, with the (R)-(+)-enantiomer having been identified as the active form. The mode of action has been reported to be blockage of blastocyte implantation sites.

Extensive structure-activity relationship investigations have been undertaken. Activity was found to be abolished by nitrogen substitution, 2, 5 and 5'-position substitution, hydroxylation of the benzene ring, hydroxylation of C9-C10 double bond and deletion of 7,7-dimethyl group. The activity was unaffected by saturation of the C9-C10 double bond. It was concluded that biological activity is dependent upon an optimal conformation defined by a narrowly fixed angle between the planes of the C6-indole and the tetracyclic unit.

Yuehchukene also possesses estrogenic activity. This is interesting because the compound lacks oxygen atoms and phenyl groups common to other natural or synthetic estrogen compounds (e.g bisphenol A). It is a mixed agonist/antagonist, binding competitively to rat uterine estrogen receptors, though with a very low binding affinity of ~1/300.

== Synthesis ==
Synthetic routes to yuehchukene have been developed due to its low natural abundance.

=== Bergman-Venemalm synthesis ===
The Bergman-Venemalm synthesis was first reported in 1988. It focuses on building the tetracyclic unit before introducing the second indole unit. Requiring five reactions starting from indole, all of which are reasonably high yielding, this is an effective method for synthesizing yeuhchukene. Importantly, only one diastereomer is produced, with stereoselectivity being introduced in the 3rd reaction.

The final dimerization step is relatively robust, tolerating nucleophiles such as 2-methylindole, 5-bromoindole and N,N-dimethylaniline. Less nucleophillic compounds, however, such as 5-nitroindole, 1,2,3-trimethoxybenzene and 1,2,4-trimethoxybenzene do not react.

=== Sheu-Chen-Hong synthesis ===
This method aims to build the entire molecule in one step by exploiting the fact that yuehchukene has been characterized as the structurally unusual dimer of β-(dehydroprenyl)indole. Under acidic conditions a Diels-Alder reaction of β-(dehydroprenyl)indole can produce yuehchukene. This is due to the alcohol precursor dehydrating under acidic conditions to produce both the diene and dienophile required for this reaction. Requiring only three reactions, this method is shorter than the previous route but the yields of the final step are quite poor.
