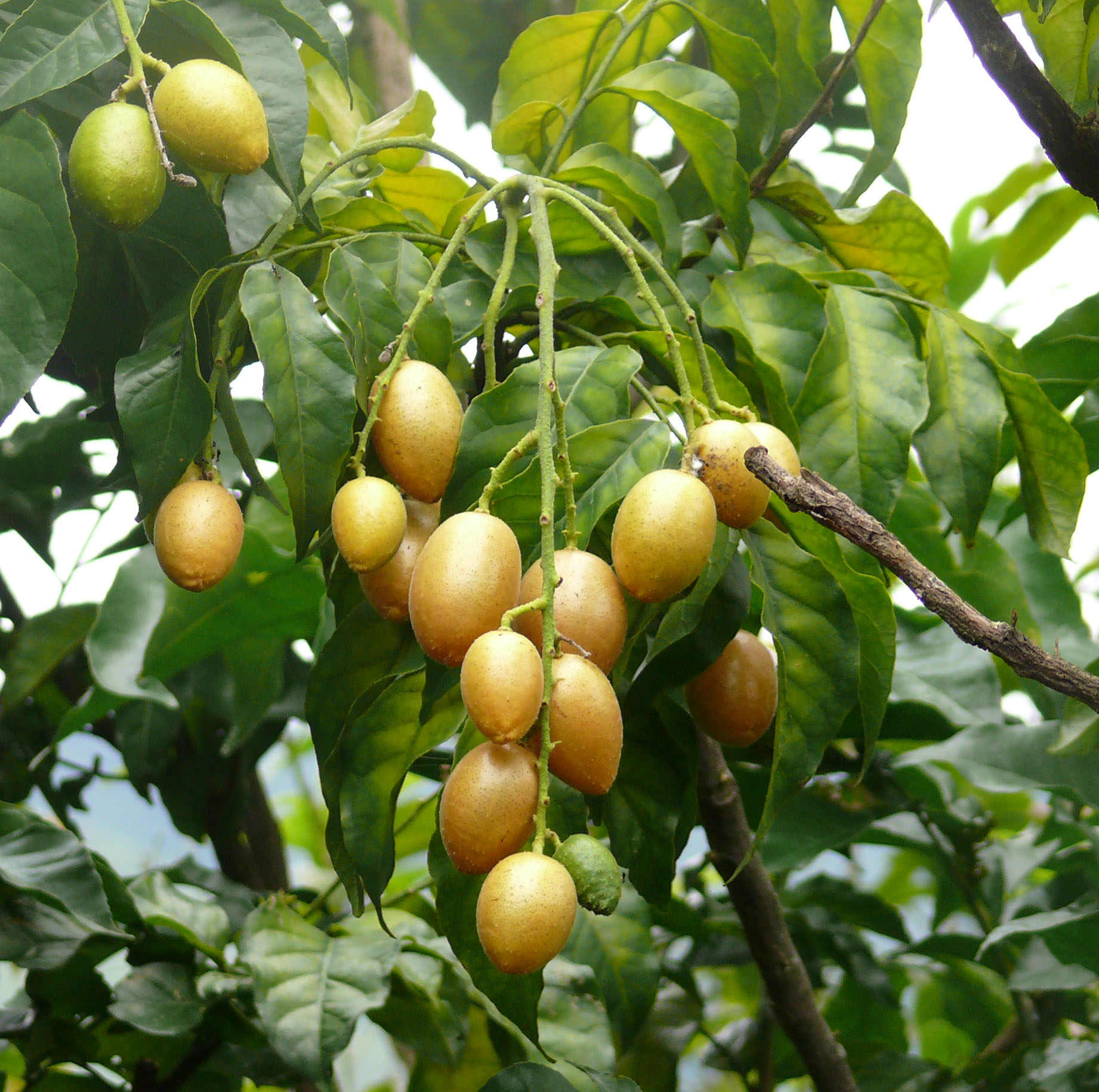
- Ripe Clausena lansium fruits

Conservation status
- Least Concern (IUCN 3.1)

Scientific classification
- Kingdom: Plantae
- Clade: Tracheophytes
- Clade: Angiosperms
- Clade: Eudicots
- Clade: Rosids
- Order: Sapindales
- Family: Rutaceae
- Genus: Clausena
- Species: C. lansium

Binomial name
- Clausena lansium (Lour.) Skeels

Synonyms
- Homotypic Synonyms: Quinaria lansium Lour.; Heterotypic Synonyms: Sonneratia punctata (Sonn.) J.F.Gmel.; Aulacia punctata (Sonn.) Raeusch.; Clausena punctata (Sonn.) Rehder & E.H.Wilson; Clausena wampi (Blanco) Oliv.; Cookia punctata Sonn.; Cookia wampi Blanco

= Clausena lansium =

Species of fruit and plant

Clausena lansium is a species of flowering plant in the family Rutaceae. This strongly scented evergreen tree reaches 3–8 m tall in height and is sometimes referred to by the common names wampee or wampi (from Cantonese 黃皮; 黄皮; wong^{4} pei^{4-2}; 'yellow skin'),

== Description ==
Its leaves are smooth and dark green. White flowers in late March are white, with four or five petals, about 3–4 mm in diameter. The fruit is oval, about 3 cm long and 2 cm in diameter, and contains two to five seeds that occupy ~40-50% of the fruit volume. The tree reaches a maximum height of 20 meters.

== Distribution ==
It is native to South-Central and Southeast China, Hainan, Laos, and Vietnam. It is an introduced species on Christmas Island. It grows well in tropical or subtropical conditions, and is susceptible to cold. Wampee trees grow well in a wide range of soil, but will grow best in rich loam.

== Uses ==
The wampee is cultivated for its fruit, which is grape-sized and fragrant. Its skin and seeds are often eaten alongside the pulp, much like kumquat. The tree is popular in China, Vietnam, the Philippines, Malaysia, and Indonesia. Less frequently, it is grown in India, Sri Lanka, and Queensland; occasionally, it is cultivated even in Florida and Hawaii.

It is grown extensively in the New Territories of Hong Kong, and is a popular fruit among the indigenous Hakka villagers.

== Gallery ==
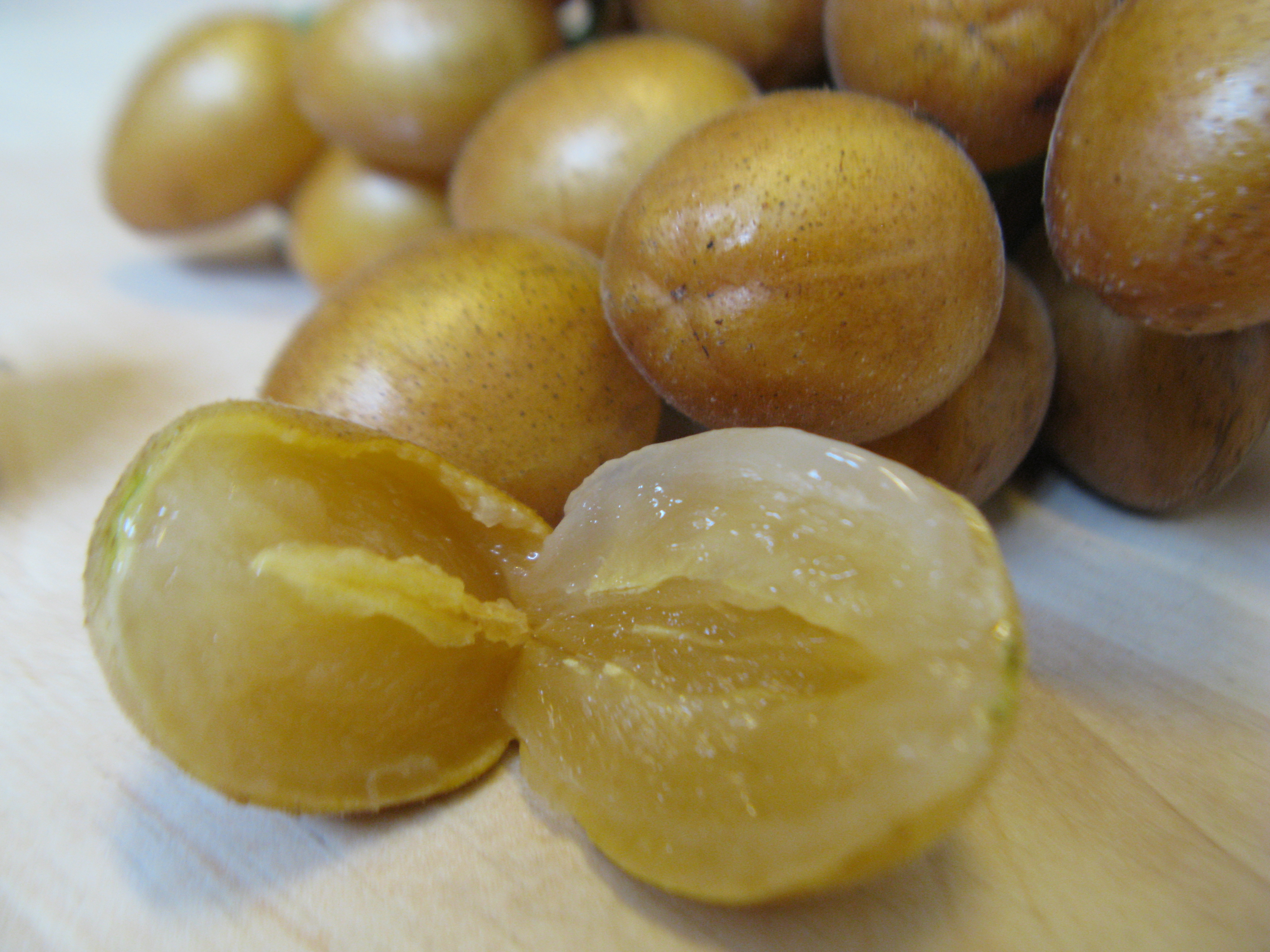
A hybrid, seedless wampee that is larger and juicier than the normal variety; however, it is still more sour than sweet.

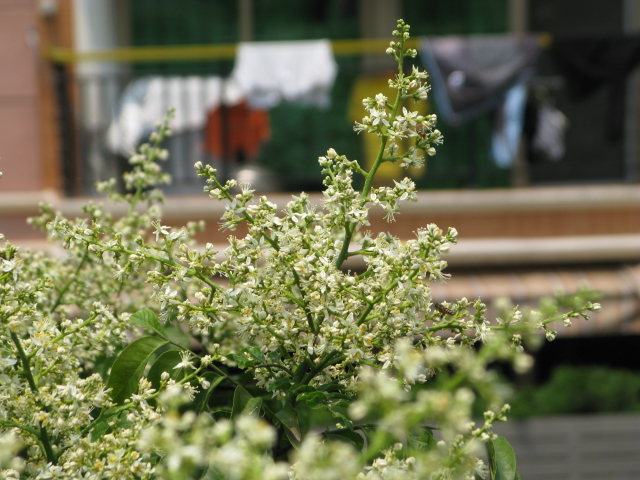
Flowering Clausena lansium in Hong Kong

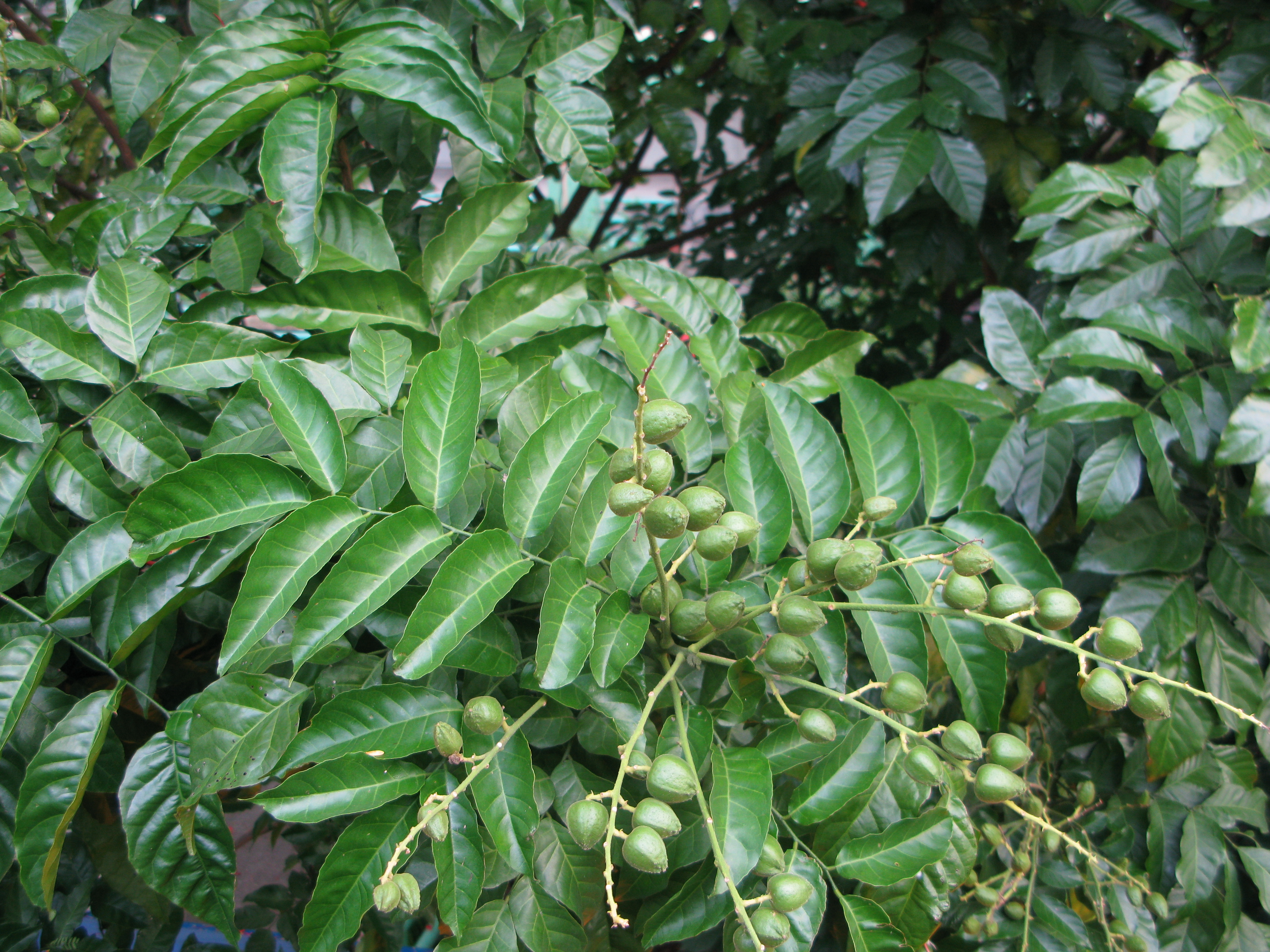
Unripe fruits on a Clausena lansium tree

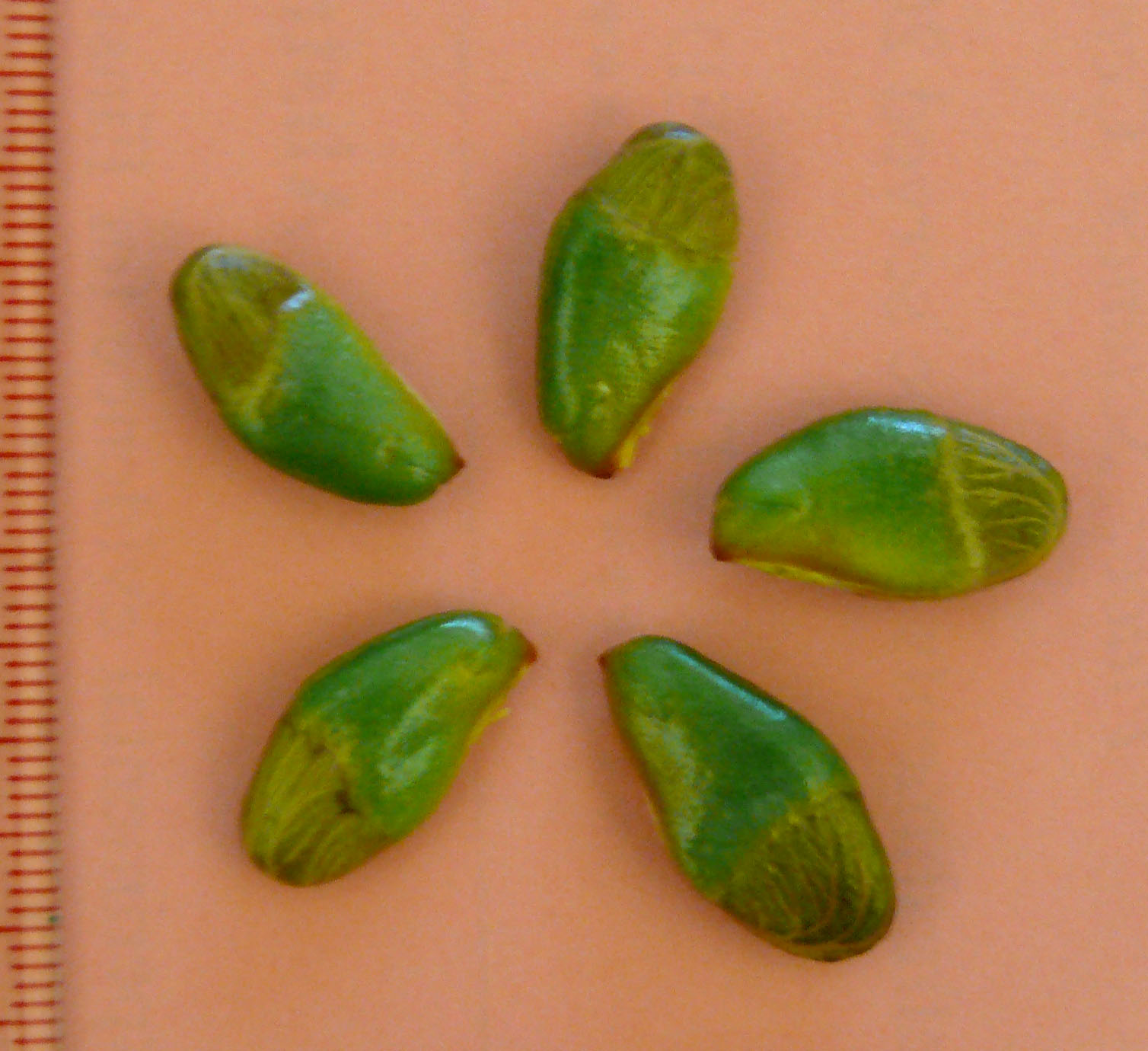
Clausena lansium seeds - the scale on the left is 1 mm per division
