= Mantissa Plantarum Altera =

Book by Carl Linnaeus

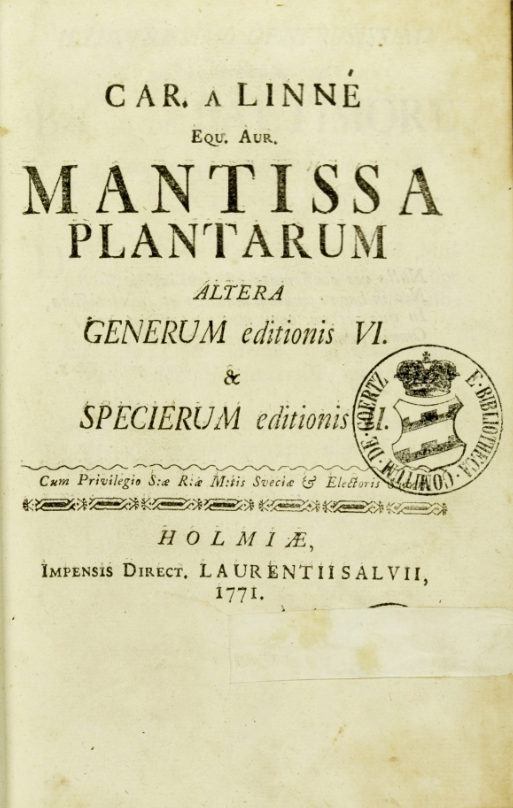
- Title page for Mantissa Plantarum Altera (1771)
- Author: Carl Linnaeus
- Original title: Mantissa Plantarum Altera. Generum editionis specierum editionis II & VI
- Language: Latin
- Subject: Botany
- Published: 1771

Mantissa Plantarum Altera (abbreviated Mant. Pl. Alt.) is an illustrated book with botanical descriptions which was edited by the Swedish naturalist Carl Linnaeus in the year 1771.

Mantissa Plantarum Altera was the continuation of Mantissa Plantarum published in 1767 as an appendix to the 12th edition of Systema Naturae.
