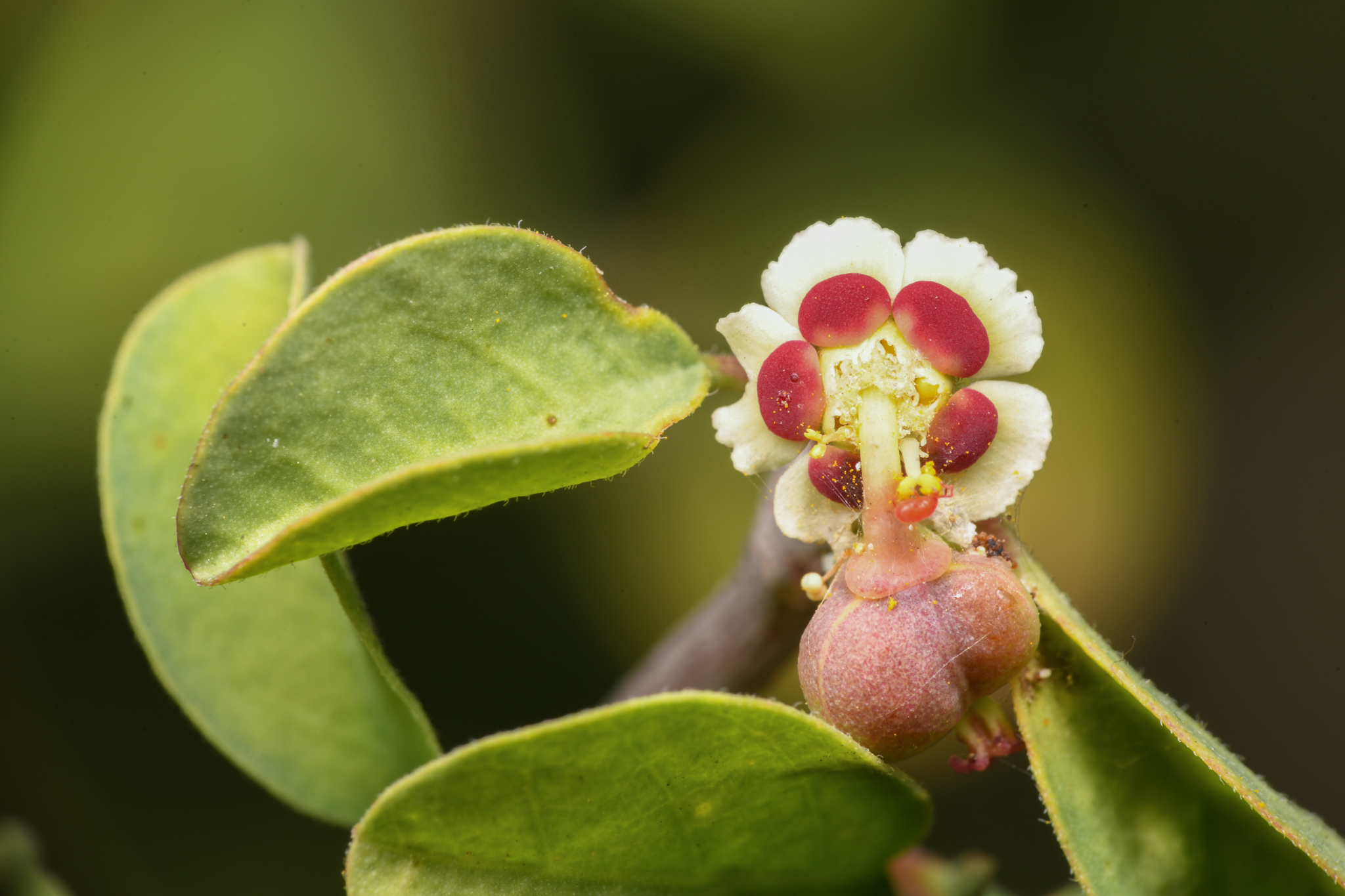

Conservation status
- Secure (NatureServe)

Scientific classification
- Kingdom: Plantae
- Clade: Tracheophytes
- Clade: Angiosperms
- Clade: Eudicots
- Clade: Rosids
- Order: Malpighiales
- Family: Euphorbiaceae
- Genus: Euphorbia
- Species: E. misera

Binomial name
- Euphorbia misera Benth.

Synonyms
- Euphorbia benedicta Greene; Trichosterigma benedictum (Greene) Millsp.; Trichosterigma miserum (Benth.) Klotzsch & Garcke

= Euphorbia misera =

Species of flowering plant

Euphorbia misera is a semi-succulent shrub in the genus Euphorbia commonly known as the cliff spurge or coast spurge. A drought-deciduous shrub, it is typically found as a gnarled, straggly plant occupying seashore bluffs, hills and deserts. Like other members of its genus, it has a milky sap, which can be found exuding out of the light gray bark when damaged. The alternately-arranged leaves are round and folded in the middle, with small hairs on them. The "flowers" (actually an inflorescence called a cyathium) can be found blooming year-round, and are colored maroon or yellow in the center with 5 white to light-yellow petal-like appendages attached outside. This species is native to the Baja California peninsula and Sonora in Mexico, and the coast of Southern California in the United States, where it is a rare species. It is threatened in some localities by the development of its coastal habitat, which tends to be prime locations for high-end residential and commercial developments.

== Description ==
Euphorbia misera is a drought-deciduous shrub standing erect or mounding. An acrid, milky sap is exuded when the leaves or branches are ruptured or cut. It has small, rounded, hairy leaves and inflorescences at the tips of the branches. The distinctive flower has a central nectar disc with a bright red appendage with scalloped edges and a light yellow fringe. The fruit is a spherical capsule with lobes containing round, wrinkled gray seeds.

=== Morphology ===
The majority of the plant is covered in very fine hairs, except for the stems. The stems are soft and rubbery, covered in a light gray bark, stout, and often gnarled. The stems may reach 5–10 decimetres (1.6–3.3 ft) in length. The branches are semi-succulent and flexible. The pubescent leaves are petioled, on short, lateral spurs placed in a lateral arrangement. The leaf is 0.4–1.5 centimetres (0.16–0.59 in) long, shaped ovate to round, and more or less folded, with entire margins. The base of the leaf is obtuse to rounded, and the tip is rounded. The stipules are thread-like and fringed.

The inflorescence is a cyathium, (a structure that looks similar to a traditional flower) with usually a single cyathia at a branch tip or sometimes in the distal axils. The involucre is 2–3 millimetres (0.079–0.118 in) long and bell shaped. There are 5 glands on the cyathium, colored a maroon to yellow. The glands are 1.5–2 millimetres (0.059–0.079 in) long, transversely oblong or elliptic. Attached to the glands are white to light-yellow petal-like appendages. These appendages may be narrower than to wider than the gland, and are scalloped or irregularly cut. There are 30 to 40 staminate flowers. The fruits are 4–5 millimetres (0.16–0.20 in) long, shaped spheric and lobed, and are densely puberulent or becoming glabrous (hairless). The seeds are 2.5–3 millimetres (0.098–0.118 in) long, ovoid, and round in cross section. The seeds are colored white to gray and tend to be wrinkled.

== Taxonomy ==
This species was described by George Bentham in 1844, based on the botanical science from the explorations of the H. M. S. Sulphur. The name misera is Latin for "poor" or "wretched", which might refer to the appearance of the plant without its leaves.

This species is related to the similar-looking Euphorbia californica.

== Distribution and habitat ==
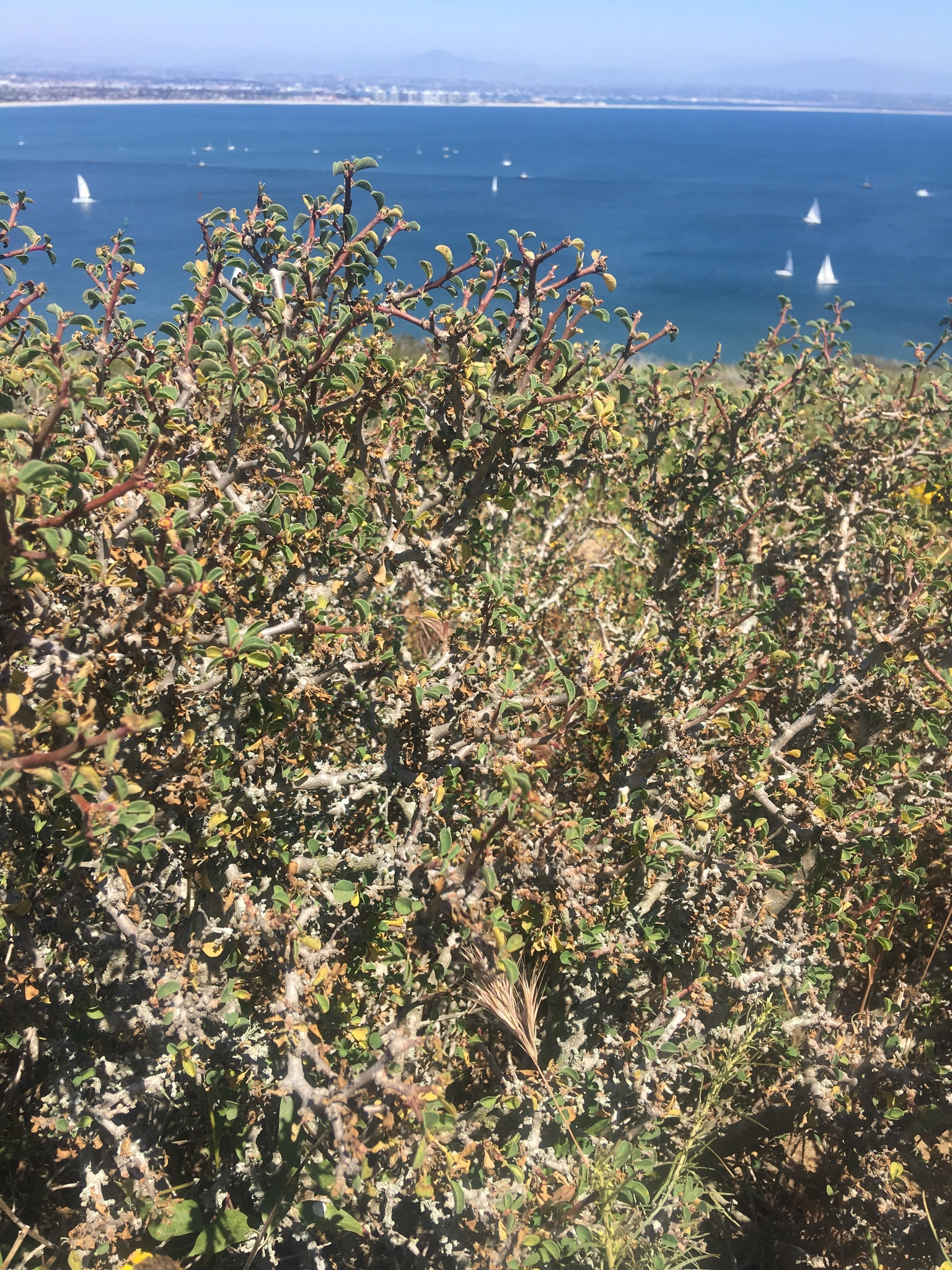
Euphorbia misera growing at Cabrillo National Monument with San Diego Bay in the background

This species is distributed across the Baja California peninsula (the states of Baja California, Baja California Sur) and parts of Sonora in Mexico, and the coast of Southern California in the United States. On the Baja California peninsula, this species is a common and widespread shrub found from the vicinity of Tijuana in northwest Baja California south to the southern Sierra de la Giganta in Baja California Sur, along with adjacent Pacific and Gulf of California islands. Plants found on the San Benito Islands have sometimes been regarded as their own species, Euphorbia benedicta, based on their larger gland appendages and seeds. In Sonora, this species is found on the Gulf coast. In California, this species can be found on coastal bluffs and mesas from Corona Del Mar in Orange County to the international border in San Diego County, along with Santa Cruz, Santa Catalina, and San Clemente islands. A disjunct population is found in the Coachella Valley of Riverside County.

This species is found growing on rocky slopes and soils, vertical cliff faces, and coastal bluffs. It is an abundant resident of coastal succulent scrub habitat present in coastal California and Baja California. Habitats vary from bluff margins and coastal mesas to outright desert.

== Gallery ==
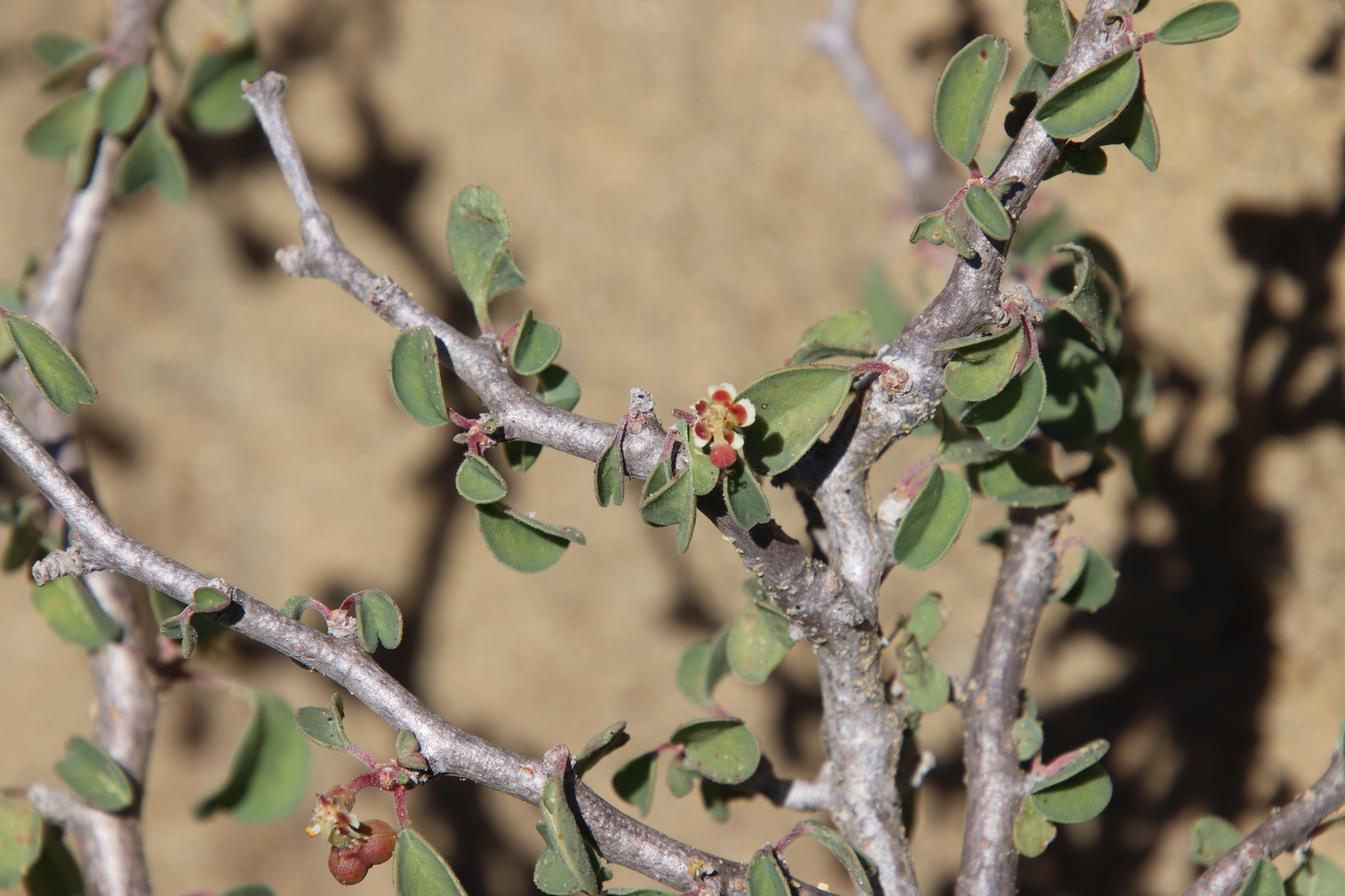
Cyanthia growing out of axils, with the foliage and its characteristic gnarled gray stems

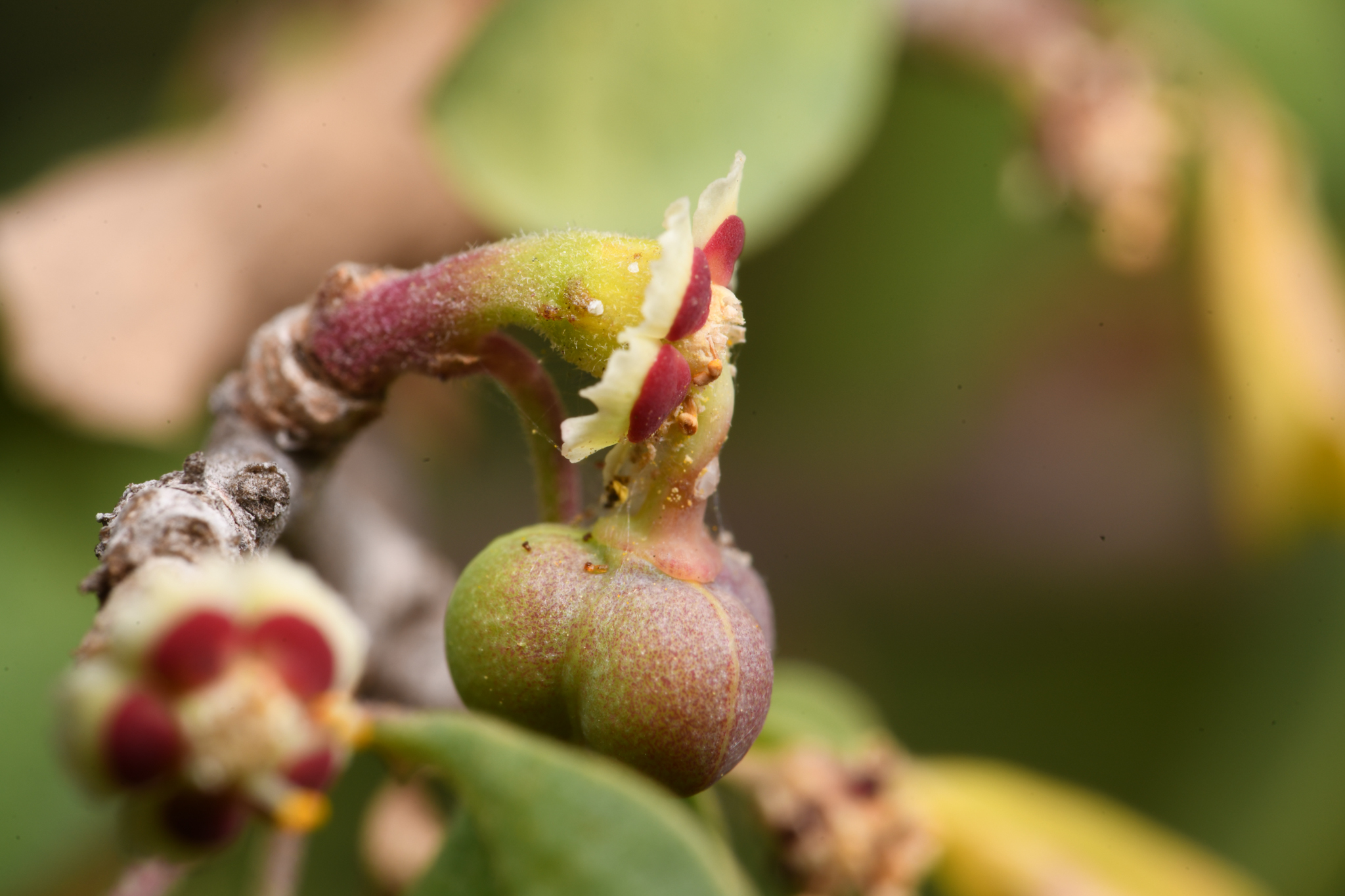
The developing fruit, note the small hairs

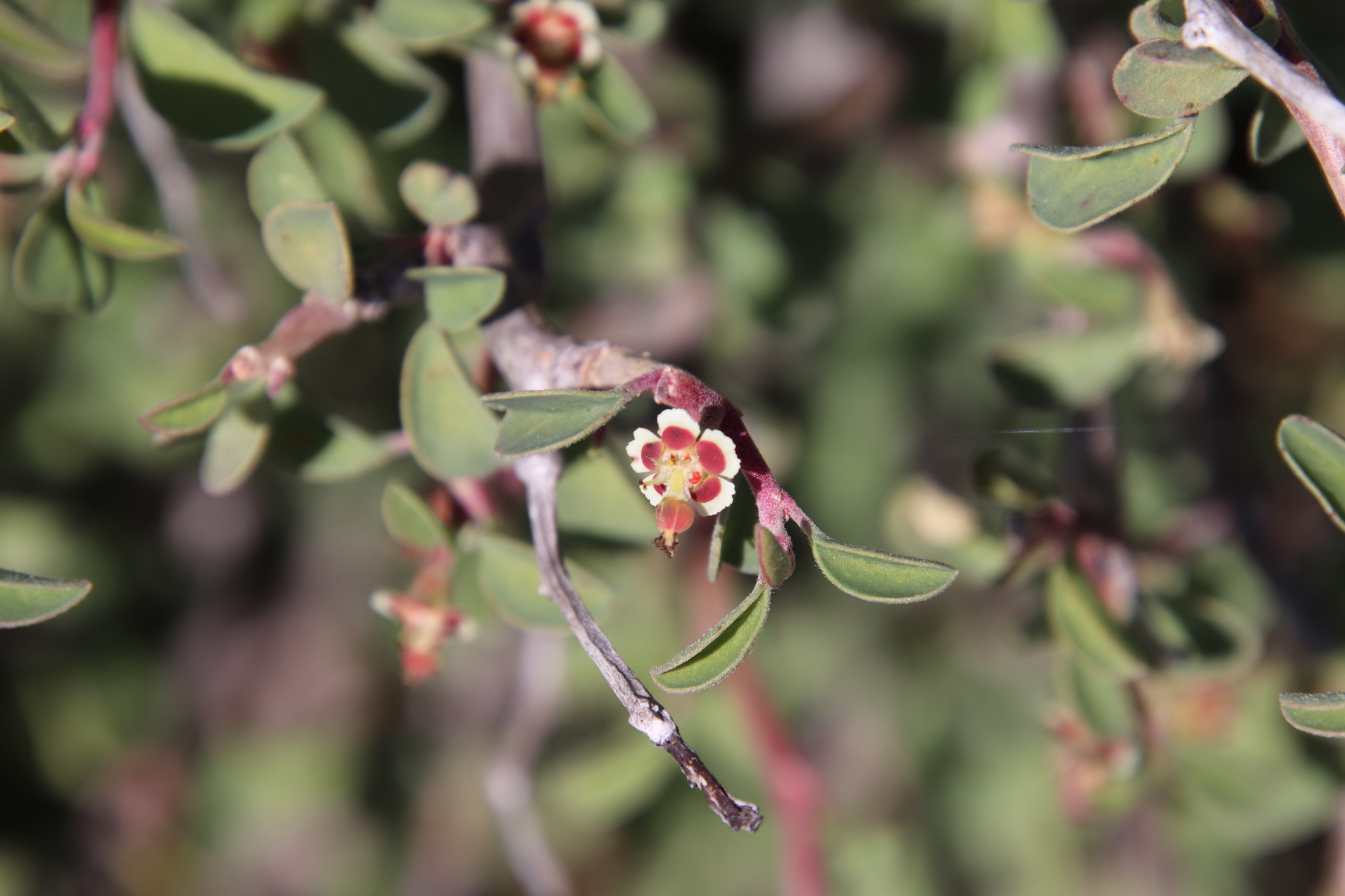
The inflorescences and folded leaves

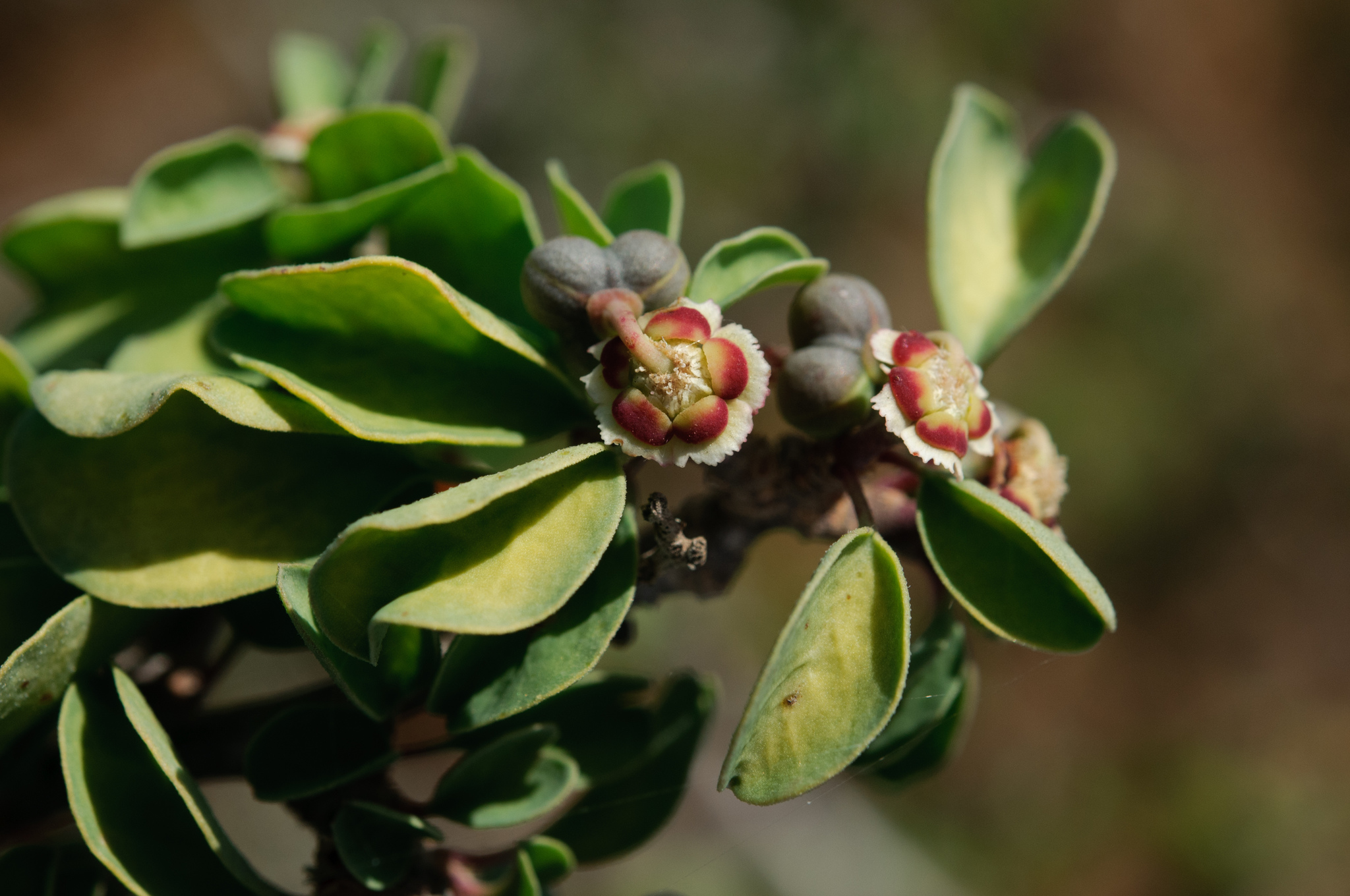
Cyanthia with developing fruits and foliage

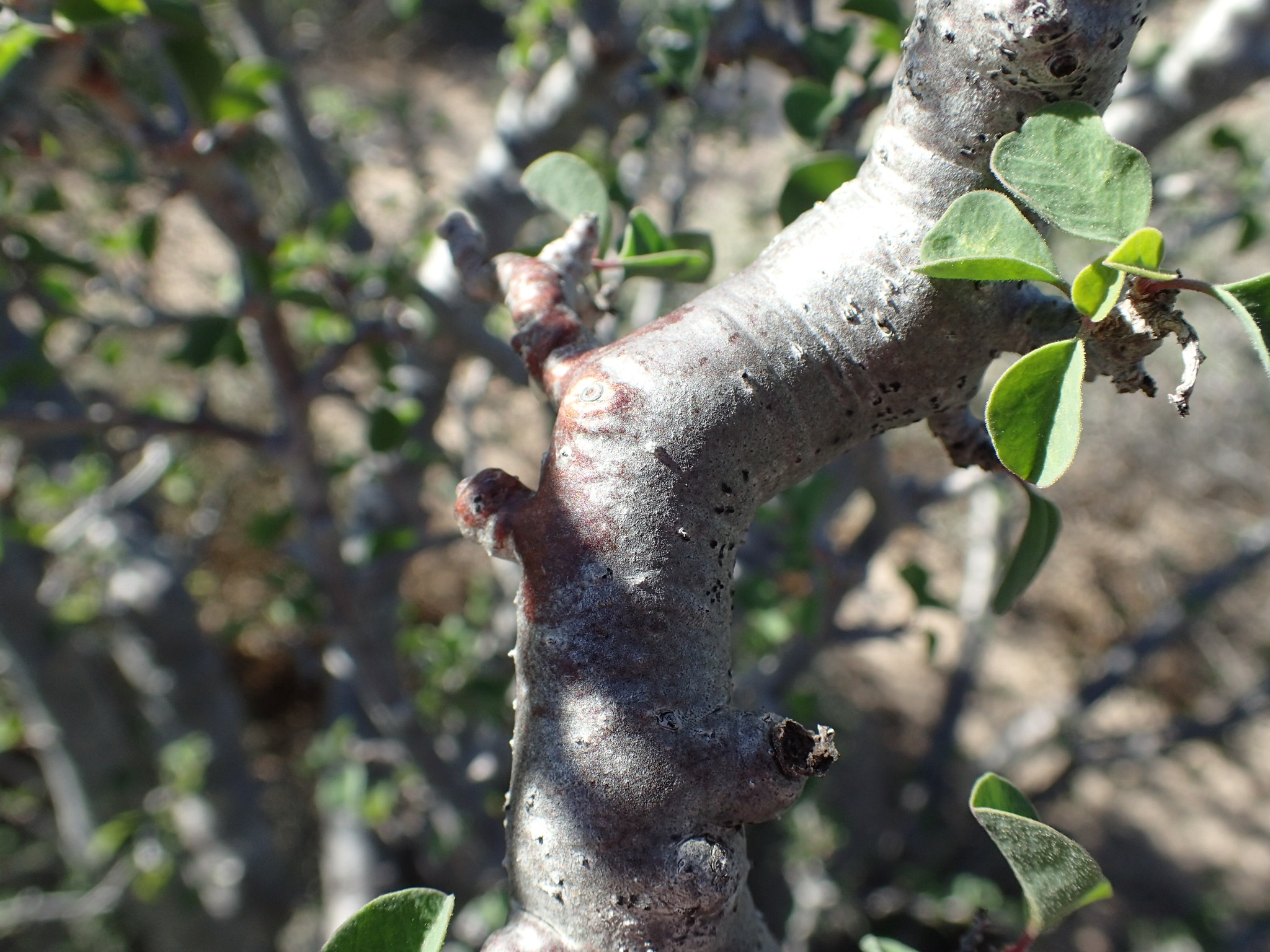
The semi-succulent stems and gray bark

== See also ==
Flora of the maritime succulent scrub:

- Cneoridium dumosum
- Agave shawii
- Ceanothus verrucosus
