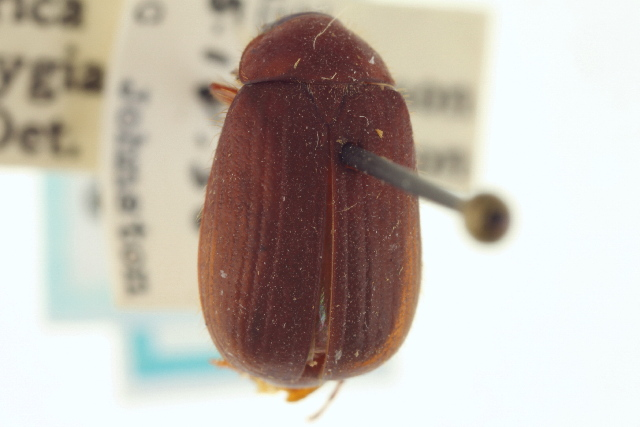

Scientific classification
- Kingdom: Animalia
- Phylum: Arthropoda
- Class: Insecta
- Order: Coleoptera
- Suborder: Polyphaga
- Infraorder: Scarabaeiformia
- Family: Scarabaeidae
- Genus: Serica
- Species: S. stygia

Binomial name
- Serica stygia Dawson, 1933

= Serica stygia =

Species of beetle

Serica stygia is a species of beetle of the family Scarabaeidae. It is found in the United States (California).

== Description ==
Adults reach a length of about 9.5 mm. The colour is brown (dark bay to chestnut) with a fairly strong rainbow sheen or iridescence.

== Life history ==
Adults have been recorded feeding on Arctostaphylos glandulosa, Adenostoma fasciculatum and the flowers of Malosoma laurina.
