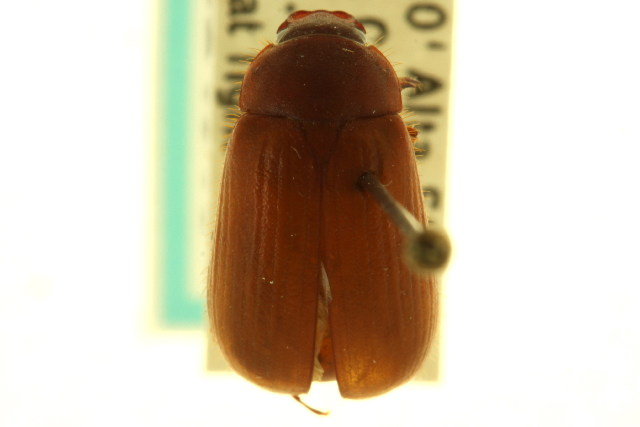

Scientific classification
- Kingdom: Animalia
- Phylum: Arthropoda
- Class: Insecta
- Order: Coleoptera
- Suborder: Polyphaga
- Infraorder: Scarabaeiformia
- Family: Scarabaeidae
- Genus: Serica
- Species: S. ligulata

Binomial name
- Serica ligulata Dawson, 1932

Synonyms
- Serica praetermissa Dawson, 1932

= Serica ligulata =

Species of beetle

Serica ligulata is a species of scarab beetle in the family Scarabaeidae. It is found in North America, where it has been recorded from the United States (California).

== Description ==
Adults reach a length of about 9.5 mm. The colour is chocolate brown. They are glabrous and sub-shining.

== Subspecies ==
These two subspecies belong to the species Serica ligulata:

- Serica ligulata ligulata (California)
- Serica ligulata praetermissa Dawson, 1932 (California)

== Life history ==
Adults of ssp. praetermissa have been recorded feeding on Arctostaphylos glandulosa, Arctostaphylos pungens and the flowers of Adenostoma fasciculatum.
