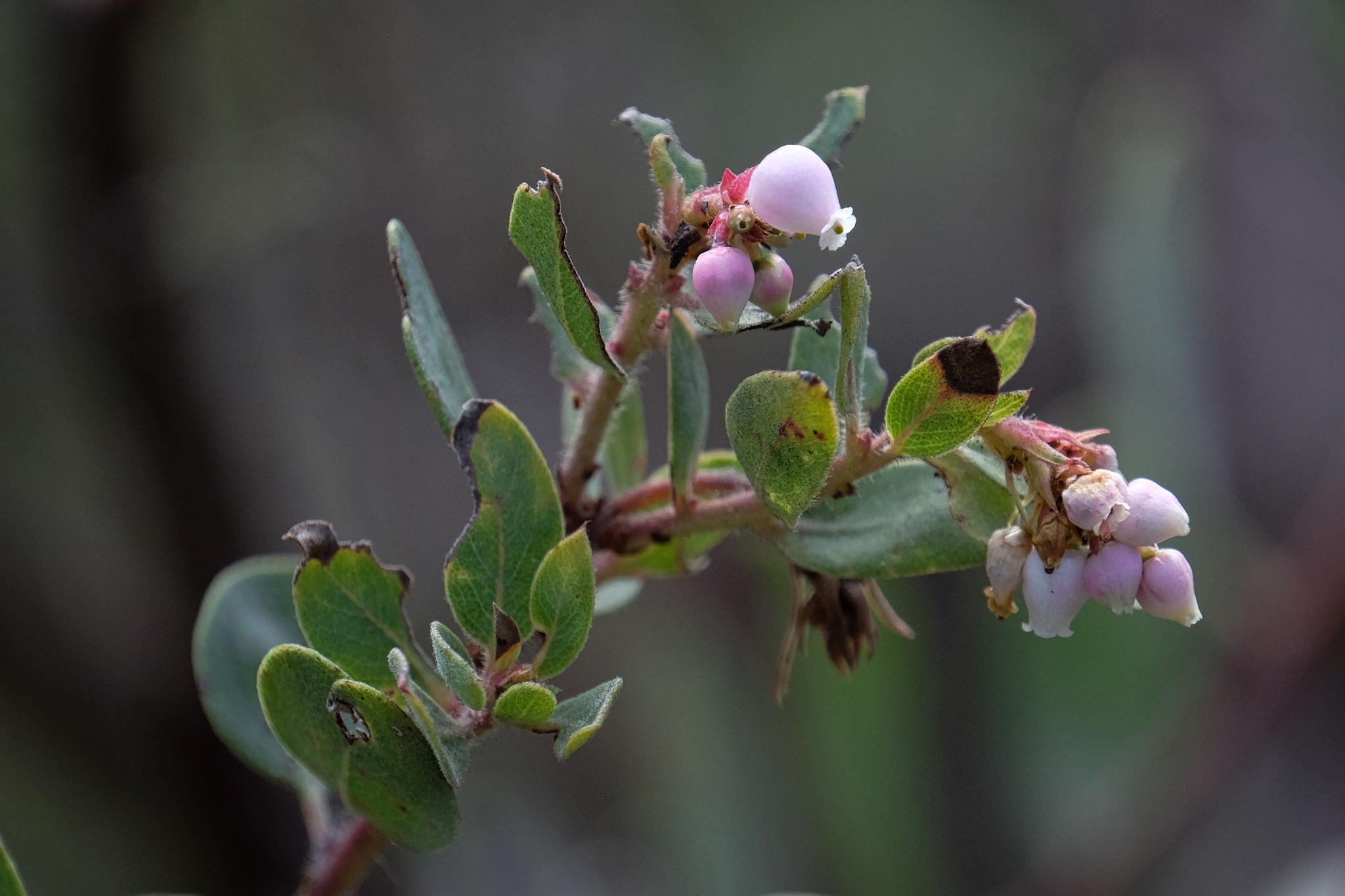

Conservation status
- Endangered (ESA)

Scientific classification
- Kingdom: Plantae
- Clade: Tracheophytes
- Clade: Angiosperms
- Clade: Eudicots
- Clade: Asterids
- Order: Ericales
- Family: Ericaceae
- Genus: Arctostaphylos
- Species: A. glandulosa
- Subspecies: A. g. subsp. crassifolia

Trinomial name
- Arctostaphylos glandulosa subsp. crassifolia (Jeps.) P.V. Wells

= Arctostaphylos glandulosa subsp. crassifolia =

Subspecies of flowering plant

Arctostaphylos glandulosa subsp. crassifolia is a rare perennial shrub, a subspecies of manzanita within the heather family commonly known as the Del Mar manzanita. It is narrowly endemic to the sandstone coastal terraces of San Diego County and northwestern Baja California. It is a burl-forming evergreen shrub typically found growing in a rambling habit on poor soils and hardpan. From December to February, white to pink urn-shaped flowers decorate its foliage, giving way to small fruits. It is listed as endangered and is threatened by land development, invasive species and modifications to the natural fire regime.

== Description ==
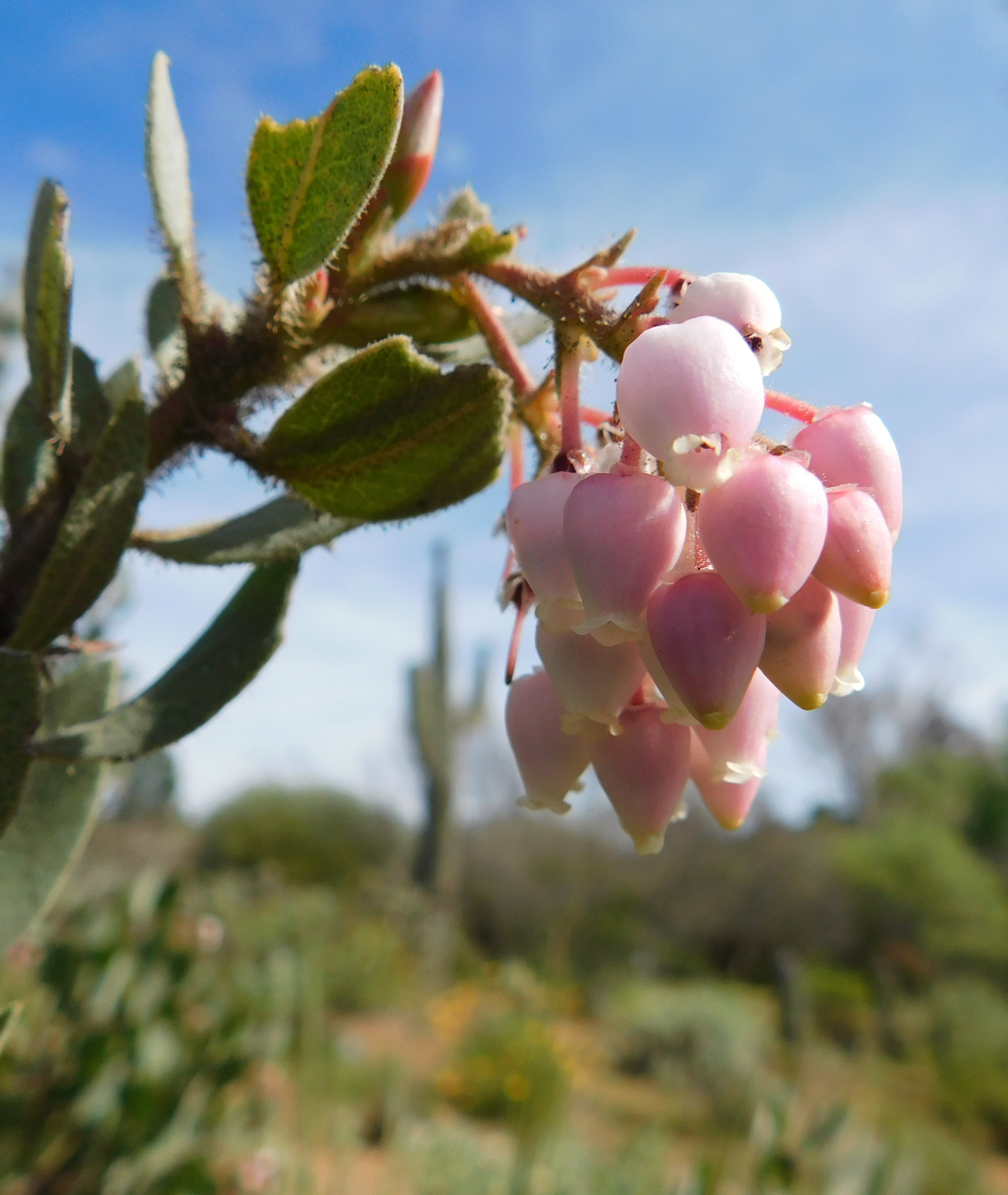
Flowers

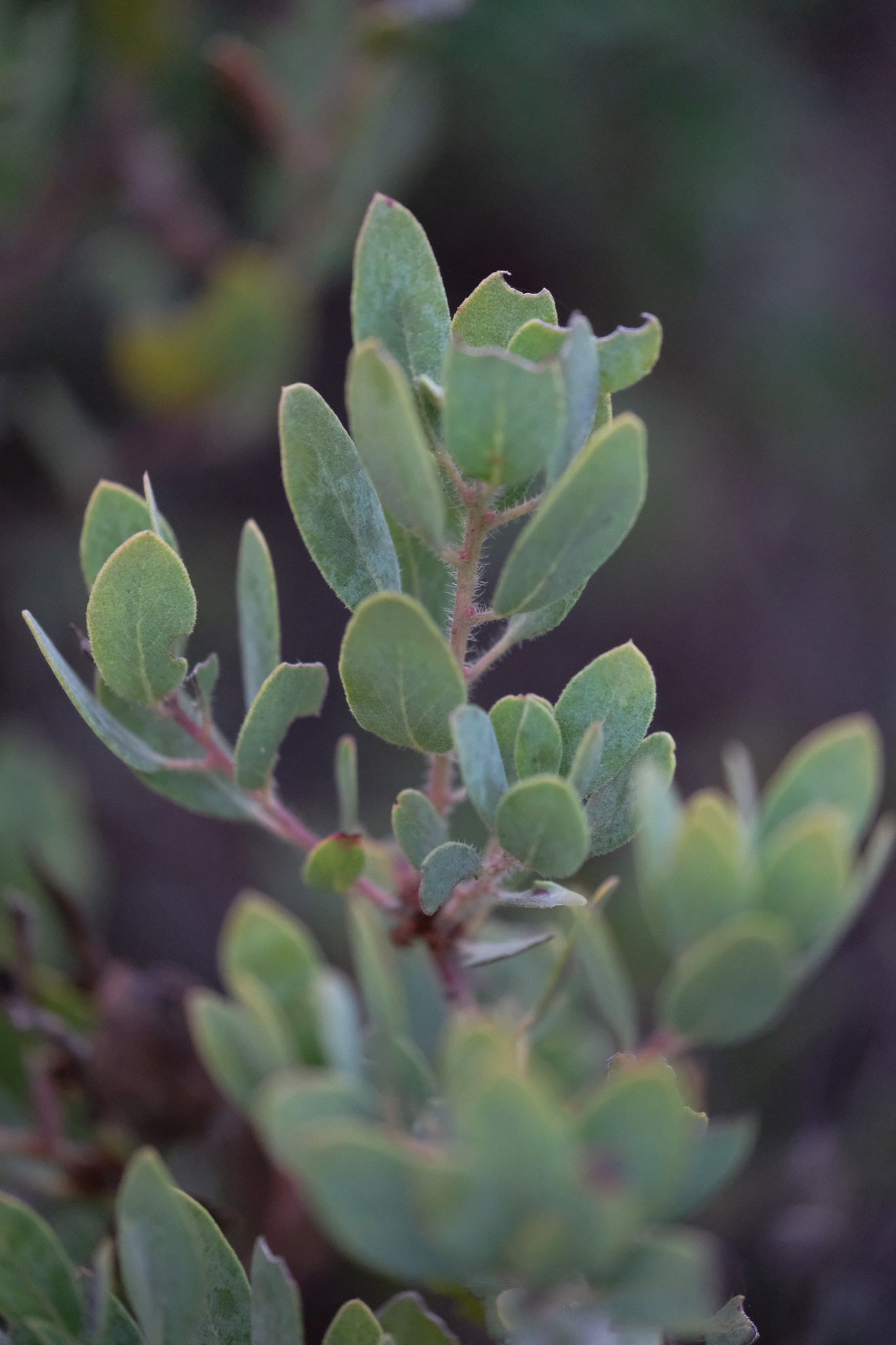
Detail of the leaves and branches

This woody plant is a perennial burl-forming shrub in the Ericaceae family. It is fire-adapted and may resprout from its burl after fires. The burl is present in seedlings after one year. The shrub ranges in height from 1 to 1.2 meters. It has thick, leathery leaves colored a light green to dark gray-green, and may have a reddish margin. The young stems and twigs lack glandular hairs, but instead are either densely covered with short, fine hairs or scattered, long hairs. The urn-shaped flowers are small and white to pink in color. The fruits lack the glandular hairs on their twigs characteristic of other subspecies of Arctostaphylos glandulosa. The fruits produce an average of six seeds, embedded within a hard, resinous endocarp surrounded by a pulpy pericarp.

== Taxonomy ==
This subspecies is closely related to and grades into Arctostaphylos glandulosa subsp. glandulosa, Eastwood's manzanita. Although morphological characteristics were primarily used to key between both subspecies, recent genetic analysis of A. g. subsp. crassifolia populations shows that morphology is a poor predictor of genetic patterns. Research concludes that many plants thought to be subsp. crassifolia are instead subsp. glandulosa, although both grade into each other. The mixture of traits between populations casts doubt that populations can be assigned names of practical value. Current traits useful to identify subsp. crassifolia include the presence of small, markedly flattened fruits and the fact that young stems and leaves lack glandular hairs.

== Distribution and habitat ==
=== Distribution ===
The plant is typically found along sandstone terraces and bluffs on the coast of San Diego County, California, and in Baja California, from Tijuana south to Ejido Eréndira.

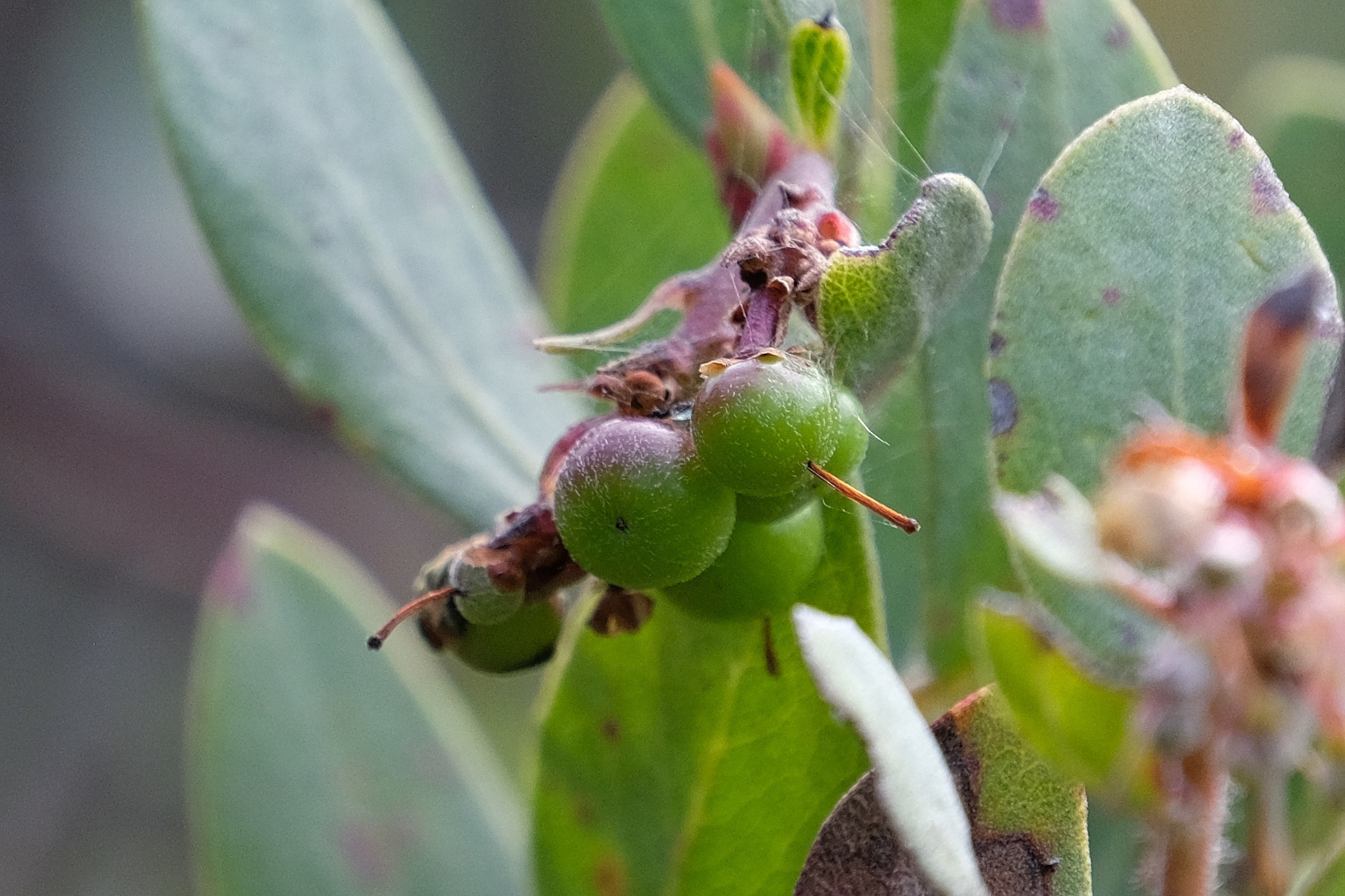
Fruiting

In San Diego County, 32 of the 50 occurrences of the plant are located within 10 km of the coast, while the remaining 18 occurrences are located between 10 and 21 km away from the coast and on different soils and vegetation types than the typical sandstones and maritime chaparral. The coastal occurrences may be found from Carlsbad south to Torrey Pines State Natural Reserve. The inland occurrences are found near San Marcos extending down into Mira Mesa, and southeast to MCAS Miramar and Mission Trails Regional Park. Former populations probably existed, but they were probably extirpated before they were mapped.

=== Habitat ===
The primary habitat where this shrub is found is the southern maritime chaparral, an ecological community characterized by the dominance of chamise and black sage, and associated with coastal fog from Carlsbad south to Point Loma. Other associated species include bushrue, coastal California buckwheat, laurel sumac, and the Mojave yucca. This vegetation community has been severely threatened by human impact. Historical estimates place the extent of the community at 21,000 acres, while current estimates place it at 1,500 to 3,700 acres, with only around 18 percent of the community remaining. The destruction of this habitat was motivated by land development and conversion of land to agriculture. Currently, the U.S. Fish and Wildlife Service only estimates that around 2,700 acres of the southern maritime chaparral is intact, an 87% reduction of the community that supports the Del Mar manzanita.

This shrub primarily occurs in limited numbers on coarse sandy or rocky silt loams, or Redding cobbly loams.

== Ecology ==
The Del Mar manzanita is fire-adapted, and once mature can regenerate from lignotubers, or burls, and from seeds. The burls at the base of the stem are covered in undeveloped branch buds, which will sprout after the upper stems are removed by fire or other means. The natural fires characteristic in the plant's community are crown fires that kill all of the above ground vegetation. The presence of the burls means that the plants are resilient to fire and can be very long lived. The burls develop about one year after the seedling germinates. The seeds are dependent on fire, and will only germinate with the presence of chemicals expelled by burning wood.

=== Reproductive biology ===
The flowers of the plant are self-incompatible, and are pollinated by bees, flies, and humbleflies. There is generally no specialized seed dispersal mechanism, with the fruits falling close to the parent plant in late summer where they are eaten by rodents, foxes or coyotes. Considerable numbers of seeds may be produced, although annual seed production varies, and sometimes no seeds will be produced in a year. The seed populations in the soil are relatively small, with the vast majority of seeds produced are either transported away or destroyed in the soil.

== Conservation ==
=== Land development ===
The urbanization of coastal habitats is one of the primary threats to the survival of the Del Mar manzanita. The flat mesas of San Diego are often the prime areas for real estate development. The majority of the extant populations have already been greatly reduced and fragmented by urban and agricultural development. Although agriculture in San Diego has now largely been subsumed, development projects are still one of the greatest threats to the species, with many of the largest populations actively being reduced by development. Nearly all reported occurrences on private land are not being actively conserved. On MCAS Miramar, the plant is found on the training areas and rifle and pistol range surface danger zone, along with development for military housing. The Miramar populations are being actively conserved, with restoration plans for the impacted plants.

=== Altered fire ecology ===
In San Diego County, fuel modification, which is the breakup of vegetation to create defensible space, poses a threat to the species. Activities involved in fuel modification have resulted in the damaging or removal of plants and their habitat, increasing the rate of habitat fragmentation and allowing invasive species to take root. The motivation for fuel modification is caused by the desire of homeowners, who border the habitat, to defend their homes from possible fires. Government agencies are working to develop better practices in the management of fuel while conserving the vulnerable plants.

Altered fire regimes are another threat to the survival of the Del mar Manzanita. Long-term suppression of natural fire cycles can cause plants to grow crowded and unhealthy, becoming overcrowded with dead branches, fungi, and lichen. Events like the Cedar Fire have had positive impacts on populations, with plants showing vigorous growth and robust branching after they resprouted from their burls. The increasing proximity of humans may also cause more numerous and frequent fires. These pose a significant threat to the plant, as they may burn seedlings and burls that have not had sufficient time between fires to build up nutrient reserves or effective lignotuber systems. The introduction of invasive plants by humans has also changed the behavior of fires. The Del Mar manzanita is adapted to crown fires, but the spread of invasive grasses and forbs lead to a combination of surface and crown fires, which may convert entire habitats into non-native grasslands. The surface fires are particularly dangerous, as they may kill the burls.

=== Invasive species ===
The spread of invasive species, introduced by humans, contributes another threat to the Del Mar manzanita. Non-native grasses like Ehrharta calycina cover the ground like a mat and spread quickly, enabling surface fires. The invasive Eucalyptus species grow considerably tall, crowding out native plants, but also deposit large amounts of leaf litter on the surface of the soil. The litter from Eucalyptus species is highly flammable due to its high oil contents, and may enable high-temperature surface fires that can kill the burls. In addition, compounds from Eucalyptus have allelopathic effects on other plants, inhibiting growth, germination, and nitrogen fixation of other species.

=== Human disturbance ===
Direct human disturbance is another factor that threatens the species. Populations may be trampled and fragmented by trails cut through by recreational hikers. Disposal of trash and green waste disturbs habitats, along with vandalism and itinerant encampments. These activities are being combatted by restricting human access to vulnerable populations, but many habitats are not under the jurisdiction of land managers.

== Cultivation ==
The Del Mar manzanita is a sand and clay soil tolerant and drought-resistant plant. It is deer resistant and attracts hummingbirds and butterflies. The fruits are edible.

== See also ==
Flora of the southern maritime chaparral:

- Ceanothus verrucosus
- Cneoridium dumosum
- Pinus torreyana
