= Amyridoideae =

Scientific classification
- Kingdom: Plantae
- Clade: Tracheophytes
- Clade: Angiosperms
- Clade: Eudicots
- Clade: Rosids
- Order: Sapindales
- Family: Rutaceae
- Subfamily: Amyridoideae; Link

Genera
- See text.

Subfamily of Rutaceae

Amyridoideae is a subfamily of the family Rutaceae. The circumscription of the family has varied considerably. A 2014 classification placed a large proportion of the genera in the family Rutaceae in Amyridoideae. A more recent 2021 classification includes only three genera.

== Taxonomy ==
In 2012, based on molecular phylogenetic methods, Groppo et al. divided Rutaceae into two subfamilies, a small Cneoroideae and a very large subfamily Rutoideae s.l. for the all the remaining genera. A 2014 classification by Morton and Telmer added the subfamily Aurantioideae, and split the remaining Rutoideae s.l. into a smaller Rutoideae and a much larger Amyridoideae s.l., containing most of the genera Engler had placed in Rutoideae in 1896. Until 2021, molecular phylogenetic approaches had only sampled between 20% and 40% of the genera of Rutaceae. A 2021 study by Appelhans et al. sampled almost 90% of the genera. The two main clades recognized by Groppo et al. in 2012 were upheld, but Morton and Telmer's Amyridoideae was polyphyletic and did not include the type genus. Applehans et al. divided the family Rutaceae into six subfamilies, including a small subfamily Amyridoideae with only three genera.

=== Genera ===
Genera accepted in a 2021 classification of Rutaceae into subfamilies were:

- Amyris P.Browne
- Cneoridium Hook.f.
- Stauranthus Liebm.
