= Stauranthus =

Scientific classification
- Kingdom: Plantae
- Clade: Tracheophytes
- Clade: Angiosperms
- Clade: Eudicots
- Clade: Rosids
- Order: Sapindales
- Family: Rutaceae
- Subfamily: Amyridoideae
- Genus: Stauranthus; Liebm.

Genus of plants

Stauranthus is a genus of flowering plants belonging to the family Rutaceae.

Its native range is Southern Mexico to Central America.

Species:

- Stauranthus conzattii Rose & Standl.
- Stauranthus perforatus Liebm.
