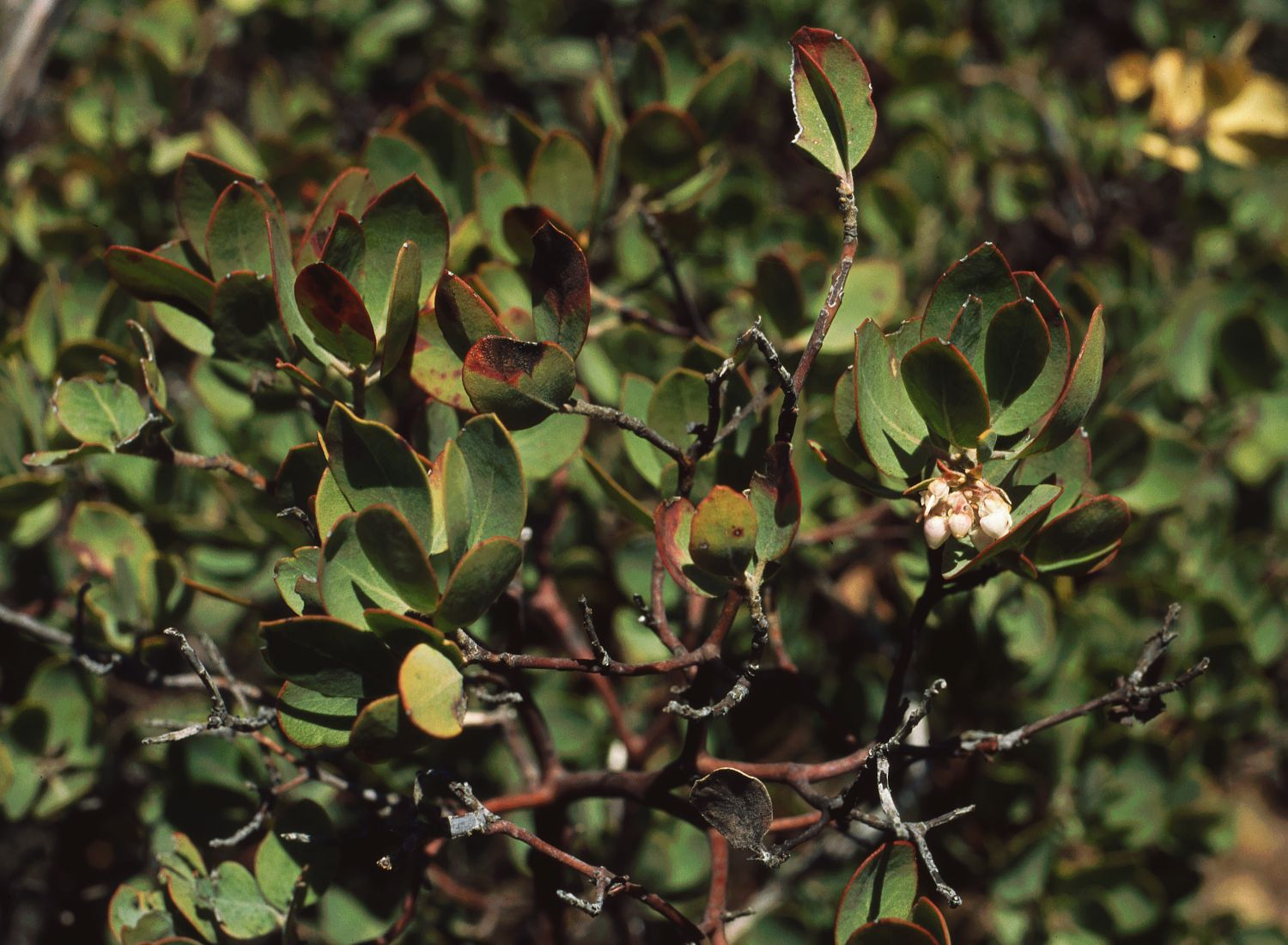
- ssp. glandulosa

Conservation status
- Secure (NatureServe)

Scientific classification
- Kingdom: Plantae
- Clade: Embryophytes
- Clade: Tracheophytes
- Clade: Spermatophytes
- Clade: Angiosperms
- Clade: Eudicots
- Clade: Asterids
- Order: Ericales
- Family: Ericaceae
- Genus: Arctostaphylos
- Species: A. glandulosa

Binomial name
- Arctostaphylos glandulosa Eastw.

= Arctostaphylos glandulosa =

Eastwood's manzanita

Species of flowering plant

Arctostaphylos glandulosa, with the common name Eastwood's manzanita, is a species of manzanita.

== Description ==
Arctostaphylos glandulosa is an erect shrub reaching up to 3 metres (10 ft) in height. It is bristly and sometimes glandular, secreting sticky oils. It is quite variable in appearance.

The evergreen leaves are 2.5–5 centimetres (1–2 in) long. The flowers are white to pink.

== Subspecies ==
Subspecies include:

- Arctostaphylos glandulosa ssp. adamsii — Adams' manzanita: endemic to the Peninsular Ranges in San Diego County and Baja California.
- Arctostaphylos glandulosa ssp. crassifolia — Del Mar manzanita: native to the San Diego and Baja coastlines.
- Arctostaphylos glandulosa ssp. cushingiana — Cushing manzanita: native to coastal ranges, from Baja California through California to Oregon. CalFlora: subsp. cushingiana.
- Arctostaphylos glandulosa ssp. gabrielensis — San Gabriel manzanita: endemic to the San Gabriel Mountains in Southern California.
- Arctostaphylos glandulosa ssp. glandulosa — Eastwood's manzanita: native to coastal ranges, from Baja California through California to Oregon.
- Arctostaphylos glandulosa ssp. howellii — Zaca lake manzanita: native to the Santa Lucia Range in Monterey and San Luis Obispo Countes, and Santa Barbara County
- Arctostaphylos glandulosa ssp. leucophylla — from the San Bernardino Mountains through the Peninsular Ranges of Southern California and Baja California.
- Arctostaphylos glandulosa ssp. mollis — native to the San Bernardino Mountains, San Gabriel Mountains, Santa Monica Mountains, and Santa Ynez Mountains (Transverse Ranges) in Southern California.

The rare Arctostaphylos glandulosa ssp. crassifolia is federally listed as an endangered species in the United States. There are about 25 remaining populations, most occurring in fragmented and degraded coastal sage scrub chaparral habitats on both sides of the border. Arctostaphylos glandulosa ssp. gabrielensis is only known in the wild from one population near the Mill Creek Summit divide within the Angeles National Forest in the San Gabriel Mountains, and is on the California Native Plant Society Rare and Endangered Plant Inventory.

== Distribution and habitat ==
The species is native to the coastal slopes of western North America from Oregon through California to Baja California.

It grows on rocky slopes in chaparral and forests and resprouts from fire.

== Uses ==
The berry is edible.

== See also ==
- California chaparral and woodlands
