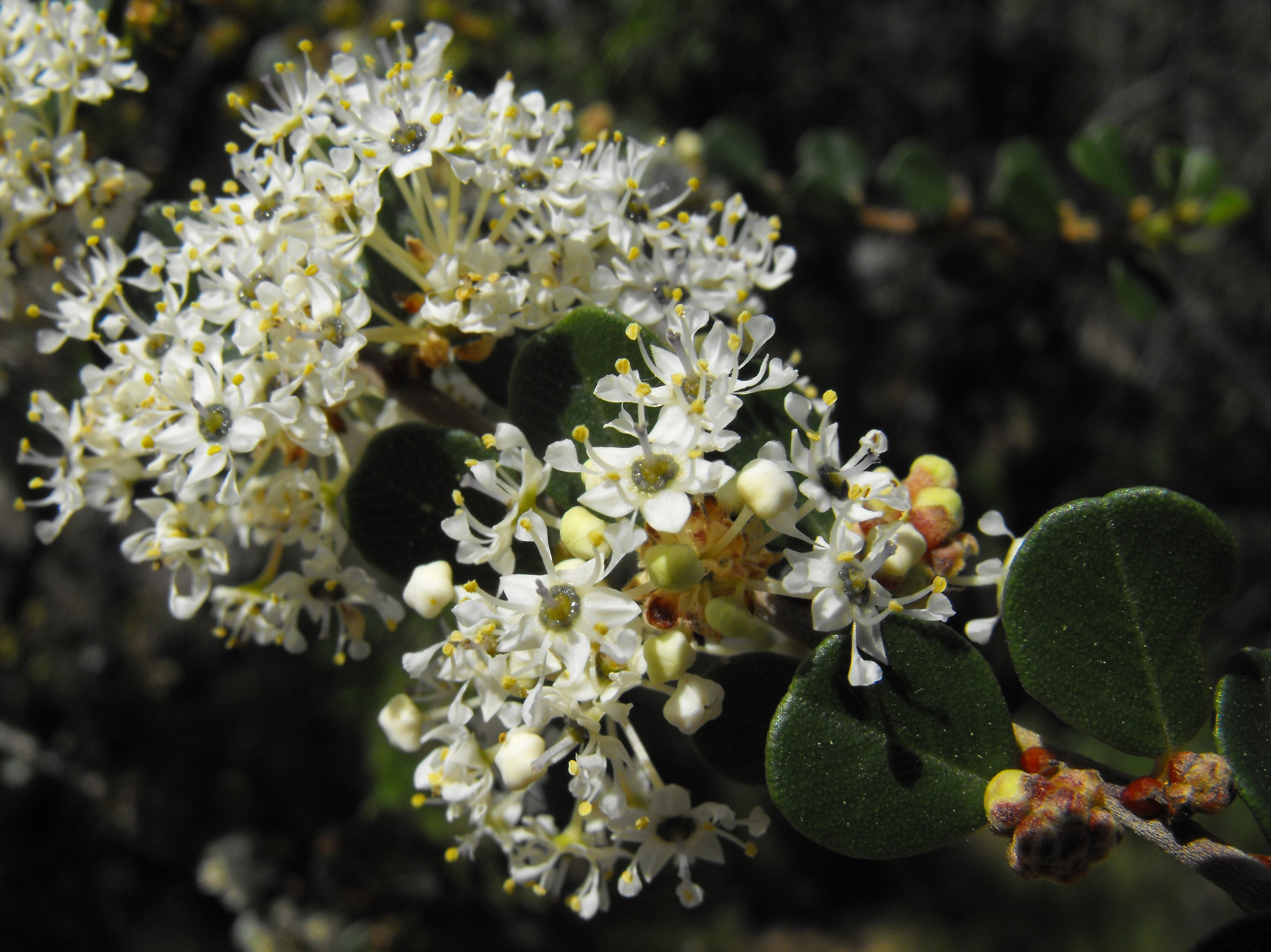

Conservation status
- Imperiled (NatureServe)

Scientific classification
- Kingdom: Plantae
- Clade: Embryophytes
- Clade: Tracheophytes
- Clade: Spermatophytes
- Clade: Angiosperms
- Clade: Eudicots
- Clade: Rosids
- Order: Rosales
- Family: Rhamnaceae
- Genus: Ceanothus
- Subgenus: C. subg. Cerastes
- Species: C. verrucosus

Binomial name
- Ceanothus verrucosus Nutt.

Synonyms
- Ceanothus rigidus Torr.

= Ceanothus verrucosus =

Species of flowering plant

Ceanothus verrucosus is a species of shrub in the family Rhamnaceae known by the common names wart-stem ceanothus, barranca brush, coast lilac and white coast ceanothus. It is endemic to northwestern Baja California and San Diego County, where it grows in coastal sage scrub and coastal succulent scrub habitats. It is considered a rare species north of the international border, as most of the valuable coastal land that hosts this plant in the San Diego area has been claimed for development. In California, several extant populations still remain scattered around the region, such as one protected at Torrey Pines.

== Description ==
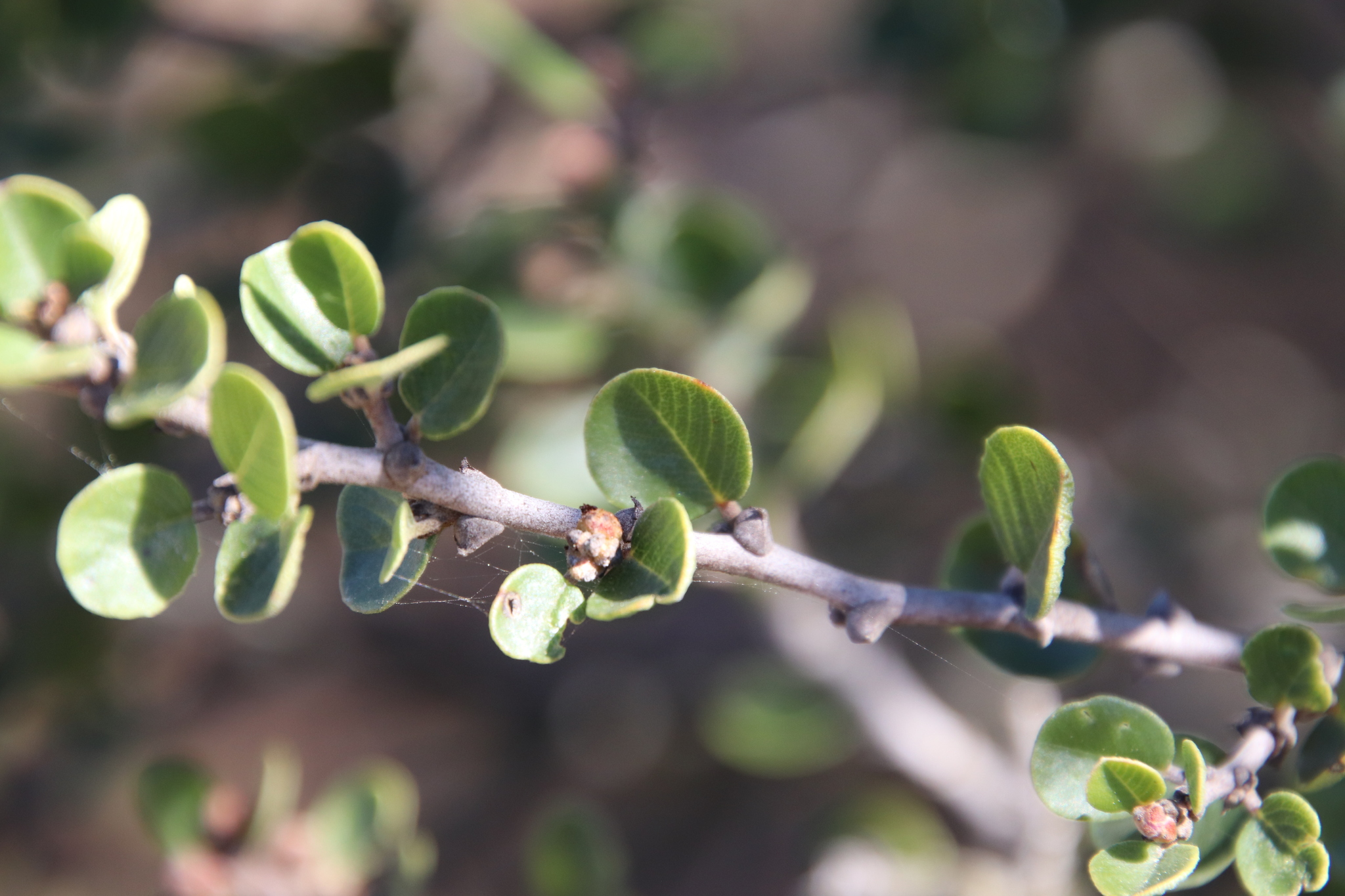
Note the warty stipules at the base of the leaf.

This plant is an erect, open shrub approaching 3 meters in maximum height. It has gray-brown, minutely hairy stems with conspicuous wart-like stipules at the base of each leaf. The evergreen leaves are alternately arranged, each up to about 1.5 centimeters long, with a characteristic blunt tip. The margin may be entire or have 9 to 12 teeth. The inflorescence is a cluster of flowers up to 2 centimeters long. The flower is white except for its characteristic dark center, which is the nectar disk and ovary. The flowers give off a fragrance similar to mild Alyssum. The fruit is a capsule about half a centimeter long.

== Taxonomy ==
This species is in the subgenus Cerastes of Ceanothus, which means that this species lacks a basal burl and is killed by fire, but rapidly sprouts from seeds induced to germinate by fire. The process to germinate seeds by heat can be replicated by placing seeds in boiling water.

=== Classification ===
The protologue for this species indicates a collection locality in San Diego, California, which would be consistent with the geographic range of this species. However, some of the herbarium specimens collected by Thomas Nutall were annotated as '"Ceanothus tuberculosus" and had their locality annotated as "St. Barbara," which was interpreted to mean Santa Barbara, which is outside of the range for this species. The specimens are consistent with C. verrucosus, and apparently were mislabeled from the beginning, representing the San Diego material indicated in the protologue.

A plant described by John Torrey as "Ceanothus rigidus" was erroneously described in reference to Nutall's C. rigidus, and came to be a synonym of C. verrucosus because of a mislabeled plate.

== Distribution and habitat ==
This species is found in the United States and Mexico, where it is found in coastal San Diego County, California and northwestern Baja California. In the United States, the distribution of this species is threatened by rampant coastal development, fire suppression, and activities along the international border. It is believed that of the extant occurrences in the United States, five have been extirpated and eight have last been seen only 30 years prior. In Baja California, this species is distributed along the Pacific coast from Tijuana to the vicinity of El Rosario. It is also found on Cedros Island.

This plant grows in coastal sage scrub, southern maritime chaparral and maritime succulent scrub habitats. Ceanothus verrucosus forms a post-fire alliance of vegetation that is present on slopes, ridges, and coastal terraces, often growing in association with chamise Adenostoma fasciculatum, bush-rue Cneoridium dumosum, California buckwheat Eriogonum fasciculatum, laurel sumac Malosma laurina, lemonade berry Rhus integrifolia, and mission manzanita Xylococcus bicolor. These communities are generally short-lived and are driven by periodic fire disturbance.
