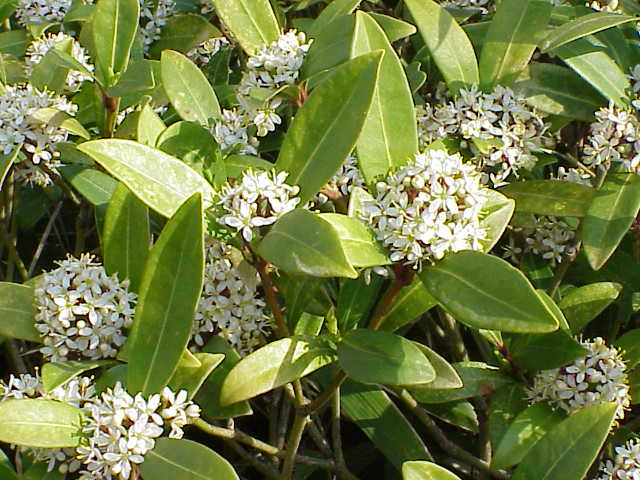
- Skimmia japonica

Scientific classification
- Kingdom: Plantae
- Clade: Embryophytes
- Clade: Tracheophytes
- Clade: Spermatophytes
- Clade: Angiosperms
- Clade: Eudicots
- Clade: Rosids
- Order: Sapindales
- Family: Rutaceae; Juss., 1789

Subfamilies
- Amyridoideae; Aurantioideae; Cneoroideae; Haplophylloideae; Rutoideae; Zanthoxyloideae

Diversity
- About 160 genera, totaling over 1600 species
- Range of subfamily Rutoideae sensu Groppo et al., 2012
- Range of subfamily Cneoroideae

= Rutaceae =

Family of flowering plants in the order Sapindales

The Rutaceae (/ruːˈteɪsiˌaɪ, -siːˌiː/) is a family, commonly known as the rue or citrus family, of flowering plants, usually placed in the order Sapindales.

Species of the family generally have flowers that divide into four or five parts, usually with strong scents. They range in form and size from herbs to shrubs and large trees.

The most economically important genus in the family is Citrus, which includes the orange (C. × sinensis), lemon (C. × limon), grapefruit (C. × paradisi), and lime (various). Boronia is a large Australian genus, some members of which are plants with highly fragrant flowers and are used in commercial oil production. Other large genera include Zanthoxylum, several species of which are cultivated for Sichuan pepper, Melicope, and Agathosma. The family Rutaceae contains about 160 genera.

== Characteristics ==
Members of the Rutaceae are mainly woody plants, with a few herbs. They give off a citrus smell when crushed or their bark is slashed. Many of them have compound leaves; some have thorns; none have stipules. There are clear (pellucid) glands appearing as dots or pits on leaves, flowers, and fruits. The flowers are bisexual (containing both male and female parts), have flower parts in fives, and are arranged in inflorescences such as cymes or panicles. The fruits are often hesperidiums as in Citrus, capsules as in Raputiarana, or drupes as in Acronychia; many of these have glands in the outer rind.

== Evolution ==
=== Taxonomic history ===
The Rutaceae was described by the French botanist Antoine Laurent de Jussieu in his 1789 book Genera Plantarum. "Rutaceae" remains the name in use (nomen conservandum) for the family as defined in the International Plant Names Index. The type genus is Ruta.

In 1896, Engler published a division of the family Rutaceae into seven subfamilies. One, Rhabdodendroideae, is no longer considered to belong to the Rutaceae, being treated as the segregate family Rhabdodendraceae, containing only the genus Rhabdodendron. Two monogeneric subfamilies, Dictyolomatoideae and Spathelioideae, are now included in the subfamily Cneoroideae, along with genera Engler placed in other families. The remaining four Engler subfamilies were Aurantioideae, Rutoideae, Flindersioideae and Toddalioideae. Engler's division into subfamilies largely relied on the characteristics of the fruit, as did others used until molecular phylogenetic methods were applied.

=== Fossil history ===
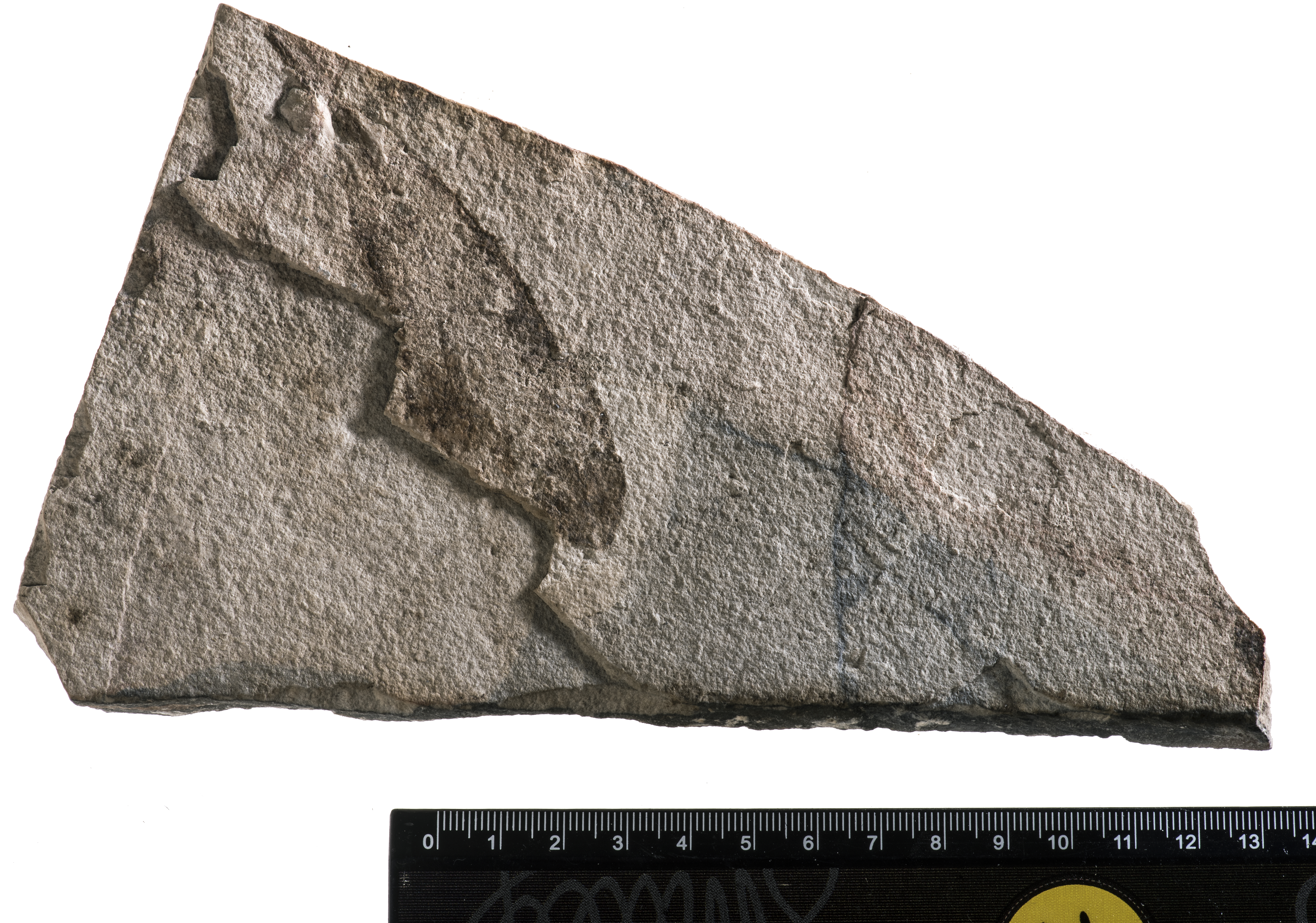
Zanthoxylum fossil from Southern France, of Tertiary age

Zanthoxylum fossils have been found in rocks from the Eocene to the Pleistocene in regions including Europe and South China.

=== Phylogeny ===
Molecular phylogeny shows that the Rutaceae is deeply nested within the Sapindales. It is sister to the Meliaceae (mahogany family); the clade containing those two families is in turn sister to the Simaroubaceae (quassia family). On that analysis, the Rutaceae emerged some 100 mya in the Upper Cretaceous.

Molecular methods have shown that only Aurantioideae can be clearly differentiated from other members of the family based on fruit. They have not supported the circumscriptions of Engler's three other main subfamilies. In 2012, Groppo et al. divided Rutaceae into only two subfamilies, retaining Cneoroideae but placing all the remaining genera in a greatly enlarged subfamily Rutoideae s.l. A 2014 classification by Morton and Telmer also retained Engler's Aurantioideae, but split the remaining Rutoideae s.l. into a smaller Rutoideae and a much larger Amyridoideae s.l., containing most of Engler's Rutoideae. Until 2021, molecular phylogenetic methods had only sampled between 20% and 40% of the genera of Rutaceae. A 2021 study by Appelhans et al. sampled almost 90% of the genera. The two main clades recognized by Groppo et al. in 2012 were upheld, but Morton and Telmer's Rutoideae was paraphyletic and their Amyridoideae was polyphyletic and did not include the type genus. Appelhans et al. divided the family into six subfamilies, shown below in the cladogram produced in their study. The large subfamily Zanthoxyloideae was shown to contain distinct clades, but the authors considered that a revised classification at the tribal level was not yet feasible at the time their paper was published.

- Rutaceae
  - Cneoroideae (8 genera)
  - Rutoideae s.l.
    - - Rutoideae (5 genera)
      - - Amyridoideae (3 genera)
        - - Haplophylloideae (1 genus, Haplophyllum)
          - Aurantioideae (about 27 genera, inc. Citrus)
    - Zanthoxyloideae (about 110 genera)

== Economically important species ==
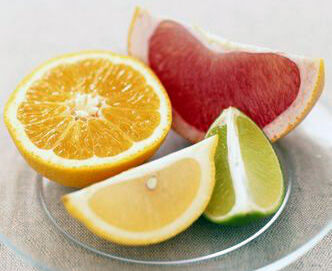
Various Citrus fruits

The family is of great economic importance in warm temperate and subtropical climates for its numerous edible fruits of the genus Citrus, such as the orange, lemon, calamansi, lime, kumquat, mandarin and grapefruit.

Non-citrus fruits include the bael (Aegle marmelos).

The curry tree, Murraya koenigii, is of culinary importance in the Indian subcontinent and elsewhere, as its leaves are used as a spice to flavour dishes.

Spices are made from species in the genus Zanthoxylum, such as Sichuan pepper.

Species such as Murraya and Skimmia are grown in horticulture.

Genera such as Ruta are used in herbalism.

Several plants are used by the perfume industry, such as the Western Australian Boronia megastigma.

The genus Pilocarpus has species (P. jaborandi, and P. microphyllus from Brazil, and P. pennatifolius from Paraguay) from which the medicine pilocarpine, used to treat glaucoma, has been extracted.
