= Coastal sage scrub =

Shrubland plant community of California

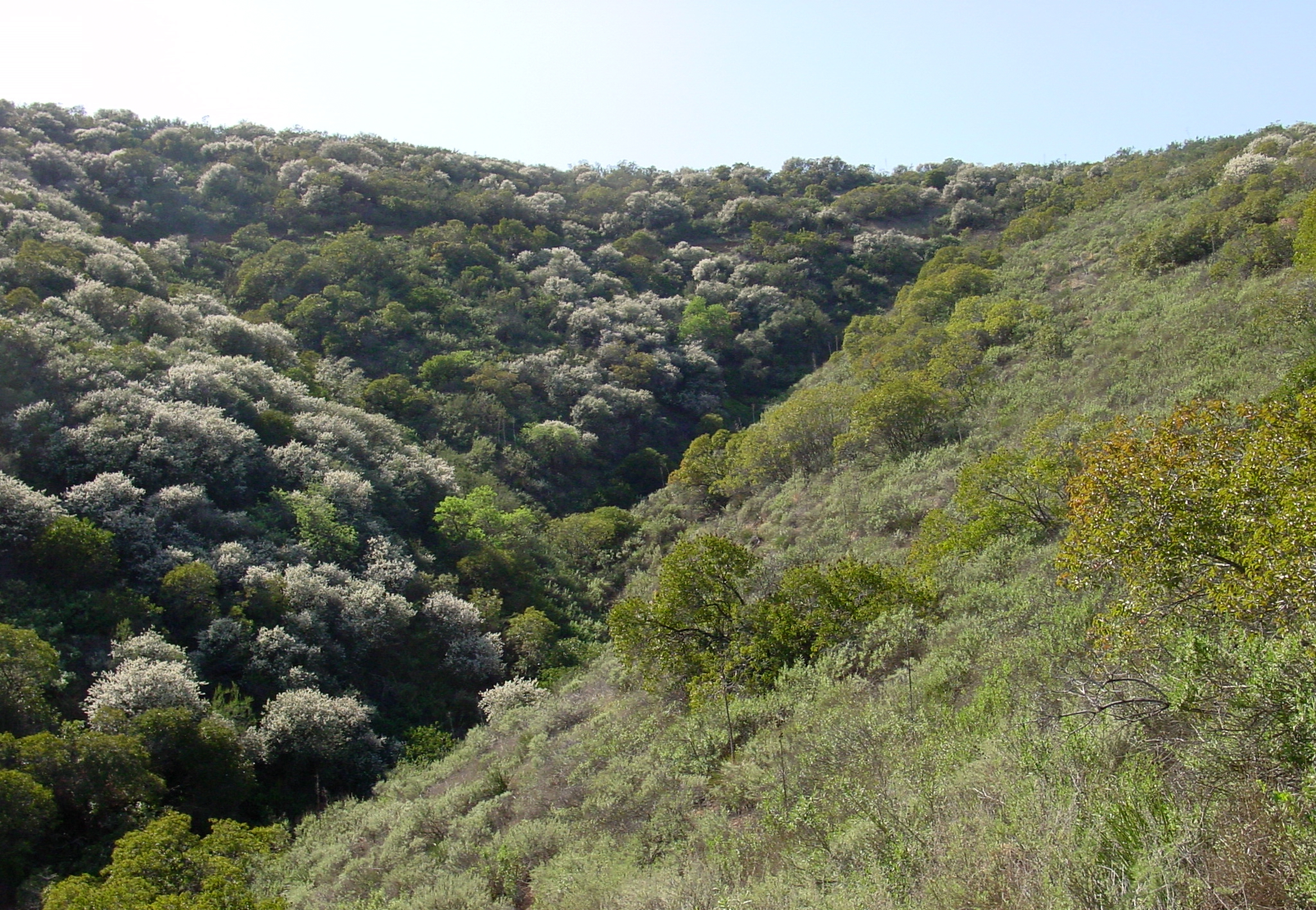
Coastal sage scrub in the Santa Monica Mountains. Note slope effect.

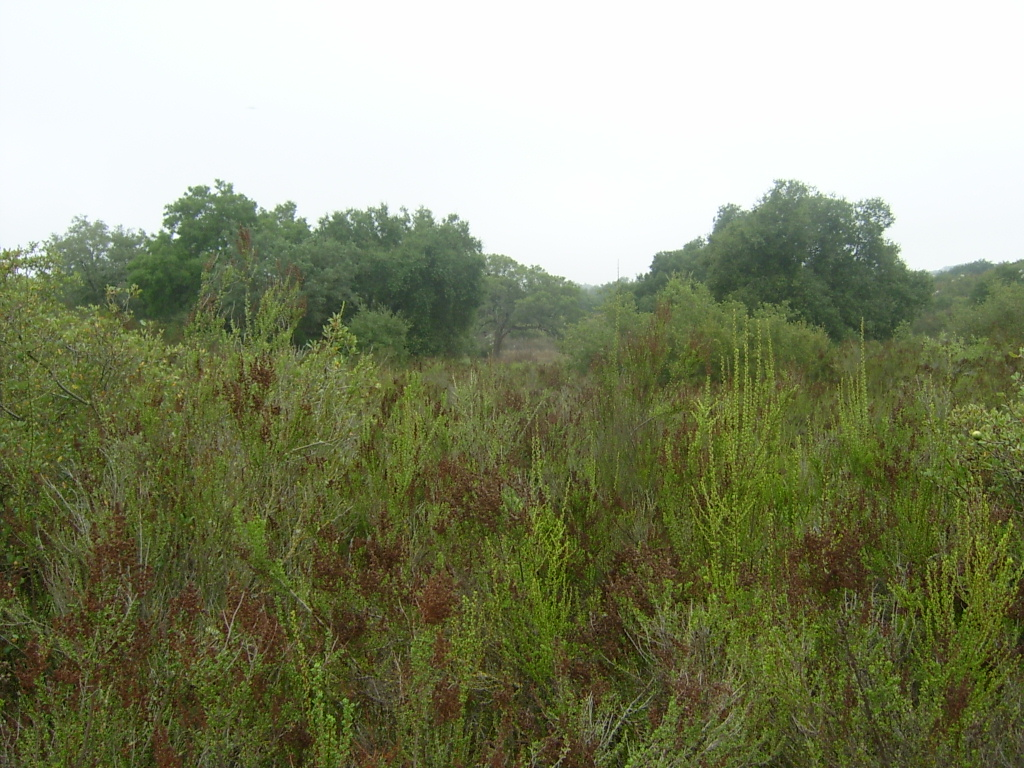
Coastal sage scrub on the Santa Rosa Plateau, with oak woodland in background.

Coastal sage scrub (CSS), also called coastal scrub or soft chaparral, is a low scrubland plant community of the California coastal sage and chaparral subecoregion, found in coastal California and northwestern coastal Baja California. It is within the California chaparral and woodlands ecoregion, of the Mediterranean forests, woodlands, and scrub biome.

== Characteristics ==
Plant community

Coastal sage scrub is characterized by low-growing aromatic, and drought-deciduous shrubs adapted to the semi-arid Mediterranean climate of the coastal lowlands. The community is sometimes called "soft chaparral" due to the predominance of soft, drought-deciduous leaves in contrast to the hard, waxy-cuticled leaves on sclerophyllous plants of California's chaparral communities.

Flora

Characteristic shrubs and subshrubs include:

- California sagebrush (Artemisia californica)
- Black sage (Salvia mellifera)
- White sage (Salvia apiana)
- California buckwheat (Eriogonum fasciculatum)
- Coast brittle-bush (Encelia californica)
- Golden yarrow (Eriophyllum confertifolium)

Larger shrubs include:

- Toyon (Heteromeles arbutifolia)
- Lemonade berry (Rhus integrifolia)

Herbaceous plants, grasses, and in some locales, cacti and succulents, are also part of the flora. Hesperoyucca whipplei, colloquially known as Chaparral Yucca, is commonplace throughout the climate zone.

== Geographical subtypes ==
The coastal sage scrub plant community is divided into three geographical subtypes—northern coastal scrub, southern coastal scrub, and maritime succulent scrub.

The coastal scrub communities are divided into three regions:

1. Northern Coastal Scrub and Coastal Prairie, which extends from San Luis Obispo to Oregon.
2. Coastal Sage scrub, which extends from Ensenada, Baja California to Monterey.
3. Maritime Succulent Scrub, which can be found in San Diego County and Baja California.

The Northern Coastal Scrub consists of prairie, which is terraces with deep alluvial soils, and scrub, which is found on steeper slopes and ravine areas. Evergreen shrubs and subshrubs, which are soft leaves. They are found in semi-open with a height of 2–3 meters, with multiple layers. Some examples of the plant species that can be found are Bush monkeyflower (Mimulus aurantiacus), Poison oak (Toxicodendron diversilobum), Coffee berry (Frangula californica), Golden yarrow (Eriophyllum confertiflorum).

California sagebrush (Artemisia californica) can be found in Coastal Sage Scrub community, especially in Orange County. Some other plant species that can be found is also giant coreopsis (Coreopsis gigantea), Californian black sage (Salvia mellifera), California buckwheat (Eriogonum fasciculatum), and Californian white sage (Salvia apiana).

Plant species that can be found in Maritime Succulent Scrub is coast prickly pear (Opuntia littoralis), coast barrel cactus (Ferocactus viridescens), cliff spurge (Euphorbia misera), bush rue (Cneoridium dumosum), and Dudleya spp.

=== Northern coastal scrub ===
Northern coastal scrub occurs along the Pacific Coast from the northern San Francisco Bay Area to southern Oregon. It frequently forms a landscape mosaic with the California coastal prairie plant community.

The predominant plants are low evergreen shrubs and herbs. Characteristic shrubs include coyote brush (Baccharis pilularis), yerba santa (Eriodictyon californicum), coast silk-tassel (Garrya elliptica), salal (Gaultheria shallon), and yellow bush lupine (Lupinus arboreus). Herbaceous species include western blue-eyed grass (Sisyrinchium bellum), Douglas iris (Iris douglasiana), and grasses.

=== Southern coastal scrub ===
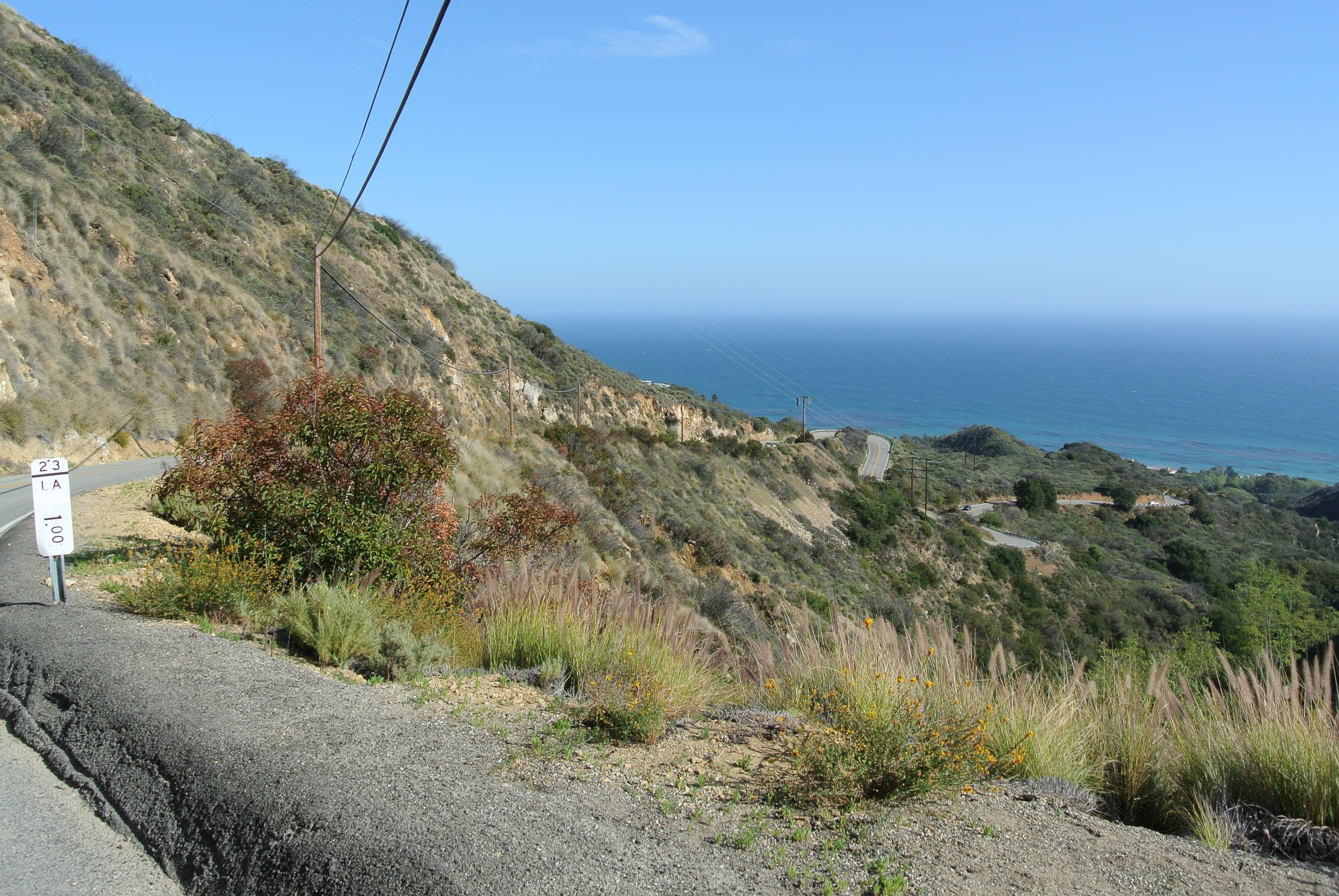
Southern coastal scrub in the Santa Monica Mountains National Recreation Area

Southern coastal scrub is mostly found along the maritime Central Coast region, and the terraces and mountains with coastal climate influence in Southern California. Its distribution extends from the southwestern San Francisco Bay Area in the north, through Big Sur, Vandenberg Air Force Base, the Oxnard Plain, the Los Angeles Basin, most of Orange County, parts of Riverside County, coastal San Diego County, and the northwestern region of Baja California state in Mexico, including the areas around Tijuana and Ensenada.

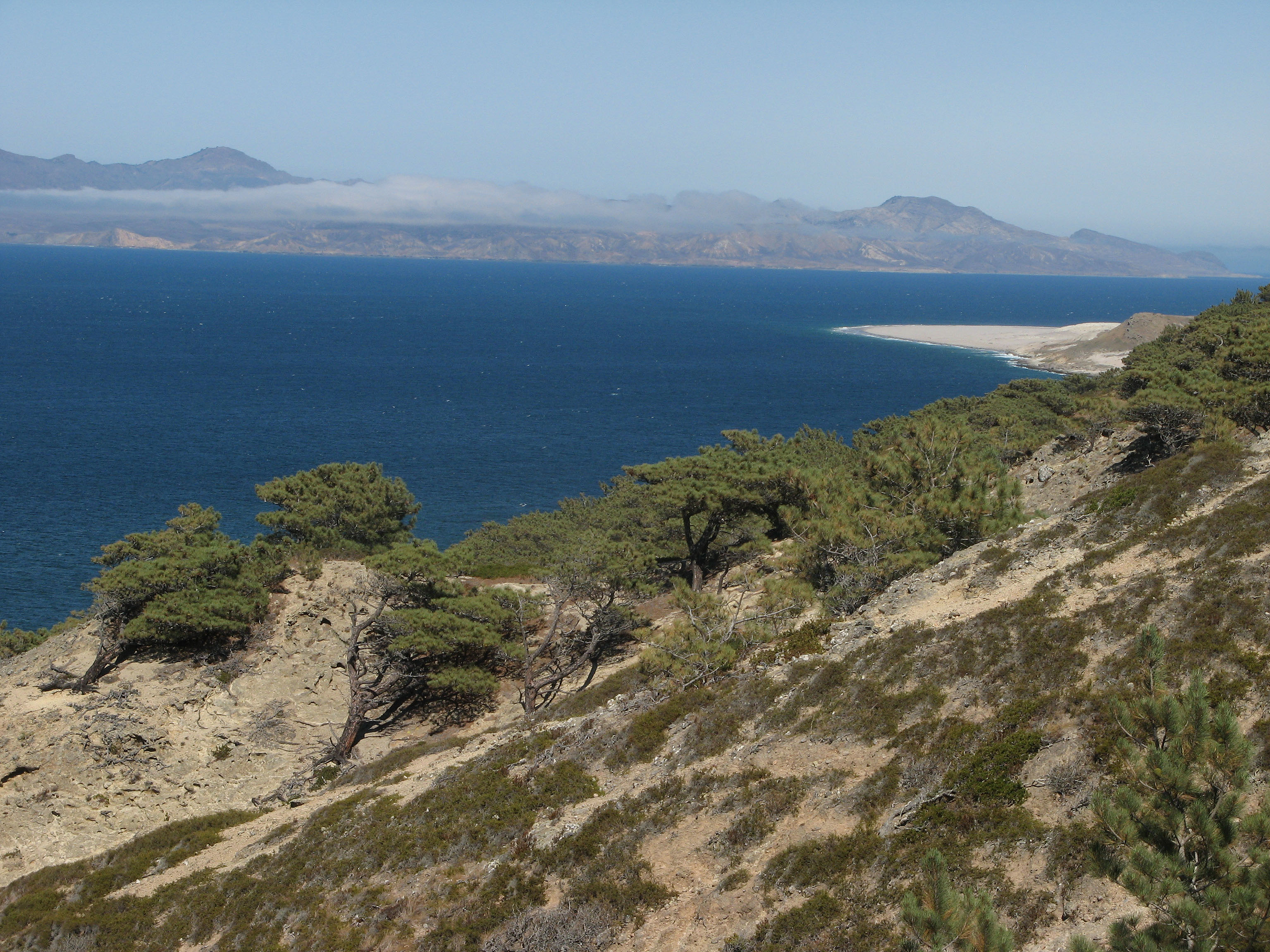
Torrey pine (Pinus torreyana) and southern coastal scrub, Santa Rosa Island.

Southern California

The metropolitan areas of Los Angeles, San Diego, and Tijuana are located in the southern coastal scrublands, and most of the scrublands have been lost to urbanization and agriculture. The plants of this community prefer the mild maritime climates found along Southern California's coastline. World Wildlife Fund estimates that only 15 percent of the coastal sage scrublands remain undeveloped. Some of the remaining southern coastal scrub in Los Angeles County can be found in dunes under the takeoff path at Los Angeles International Airport—LAX, in the coastal Santa Monica Mountains National Recreation Area, and at the Robert J. Bernard Field Station at the Claremont Colleges. In San Diego County, the Camp Pendleton Marine Corps Base protects larger areas, and the Marine Corps Air Station Miramar has vernal pools and the endemic mint Pogogyne abramsii. One of the largest remaining areas of inland coastal sage scrub is found in the Temescal Mountains of Riverside County.

A few rare and endangered species occur in southern coastal scrub habitats. For example, the coastal California gnatcatcher (Polioptila californica californica) is a threatened bird species endemic to the coastal sage scrublands. Other endemic fauna includes the El Segundo blue butterfly in the LAX dunes; and the Palos Verdes blue butterfly (Glaucopsyche lygdamus palosverdesensis), at only one site on the Palos Verdes Peninsula.

The endangered Torrey pine (Pinus torreyana) is the dominant tree at Torrey Pines State Natural Reserve in San Diego, one of only two known stands of this pine species.

== See also ==
- California coastal prairie
- California coastal sage and chaparral
- Terrace (geology)

== Notes ==
=== References ===
- In: Mayer KE and Laudenslayer WF. A Guide to Wildlife Habitats of California. Sacramento, CA: California Department of Fish and Game; "Coastal Scrub"; de Becker, Sally. (1988).
- Schoenherr, Allan A. (1992). A Natural History of California. Berkeley, CA: University of California Press.
