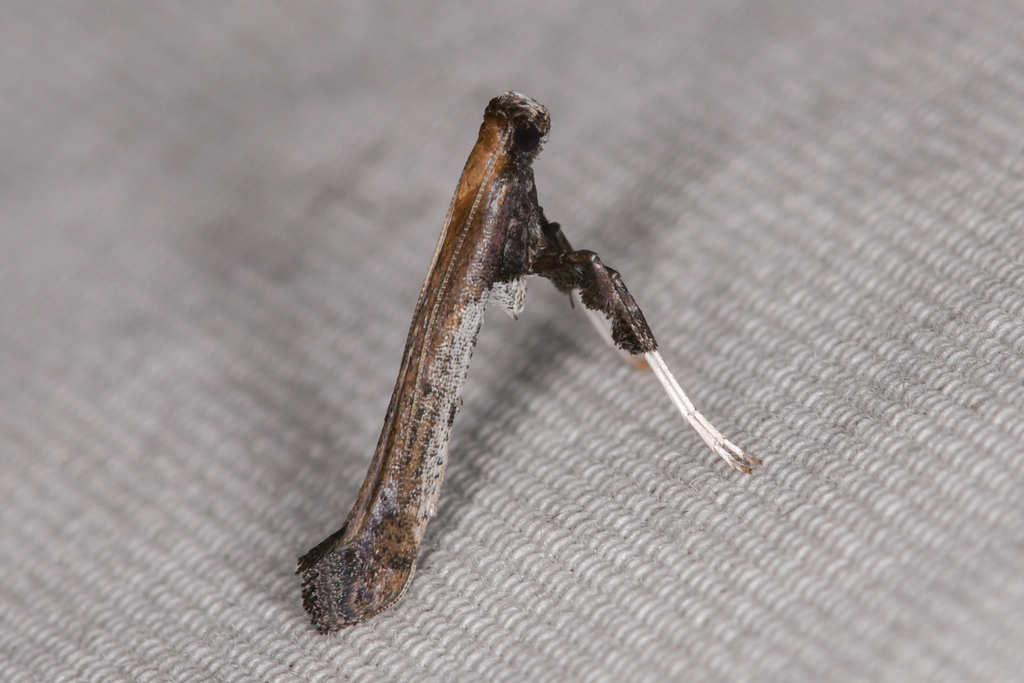

Scientific classification
- Kingdom: Animalia
- Phylum: Arthropoda
- Clade: Pancrustacea
- Class: Insecta
- Order: Lepidoptera
- Family: Gracillariidae
- Genus: Caloptilia
- Species: C. ovatiella

Binomial name
- Caloptilia ovatiella Opler, 1969

= Caloptilia ovatiella =

Species of moth

Caloptilia ovatiella is a moth of the family Gracillariidae. It is known from California, United States.

The larvae feed on Malosma laurina, Rhus integrifolia and Rhus ovata. They mine the leaves of their host plant.
