= Chaparral =

Shrubland plant community in western North America

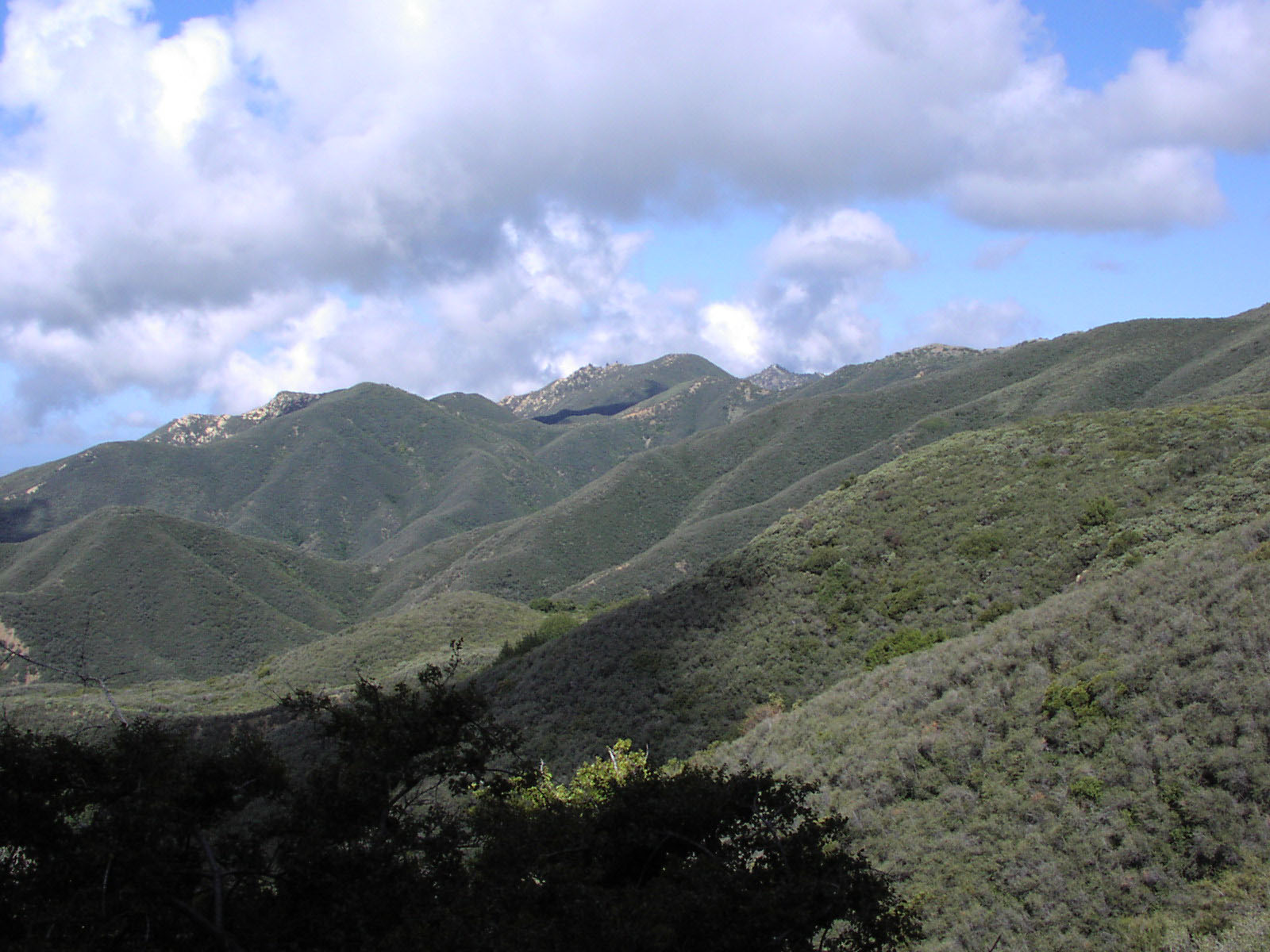
Chaparral in the Santa Ynez Mountains, near Santa Barbara, California

Chaparral (/ˌʃæpəˈræl, ˌtʃæp-/ SHAP-ə-RAL, CHAP-) is a shrubland plant community found primarily in California, southern Oregon, and northern Baja California, part of the California floristic province. It is shaped by a Mediterranean climate (mild wet winters and hot dry summers) and infrequent, high-intensity crown fires. Many chaparral shrubs have hard sclerophyllous evergreen leaves, in contrast to the soft-leaved, drought-deciduous, coastal sage scrub that is often found on drier, southern-facing slopes.

Three other closely related chaparral shrubland systems occur in southern Arizona, western Texas, and along the eastern side of central Mexico's mountain chains, all having summer rains in contrast to the Mediterranean climate of other chaparral formations.

== Etymology ==
The name comes from the Spanish word chaparro, and translates to 'place of the scrub oak'. This word in turn comes from the Basque word txapar, which has the same meaning.

== Overview ==
In its natural state, chaparral is characterized by infrequent fires, with natural fire return intervals ranging between 30 years and over 150 years. Mature chaparral (at least 60 years since time of last fire) is characterized by nearly impenetrable, dense thickets (except the more open desert chaparral). These plants are flammable during the late summer and autumn months when conditions are characteristically hot and dry. They grow as woody shrubs with thick, leathery, evergreen and often small leaves. The plants are typically drought resistant, with some exceptions. After the first rains following a fire, the landscape is dominated by small flowering herbaceous plants, known as fire followers, which die back with the summer dry period.

Chaparral characteristically is found in areas with steep topography and shallow stony soils, while adjacent areas with clay soils, even where steep, tend to be colonized by annual plants and grasses. Some chaparral species are adapted to nutrient-poor soils developed over serpentine and other ultramafic rock, with a high ratio of magnesium and iron to calcium and potassium, that are also generally low in essential nutrients such as nitrogen.

Similar plant communities are found in the four other Mediterranean climate regions around the world, including the Mediterranean Basin (where it is known as maquis), central Chile (where it is called matorral), the South African Cape Region (known there as fynbos), and in Western and Southern Australia (as mallee or kwongan).

=== Biodiversity ===
Conservation International and other conservation organizations consider chaparral to be a biodiversity hotspot – a biological community with a large number of different species that is threatened by human activity.

According to the California Academy of Sciences, Mediterranean shrubland contains more than 20% of the world's plant diversity. Chaparral comprises 9% of California's wildland vegetation and contains 20% of its plant species.

== California chaparral ==
=== California chaparral and woodlands ecoregion ===
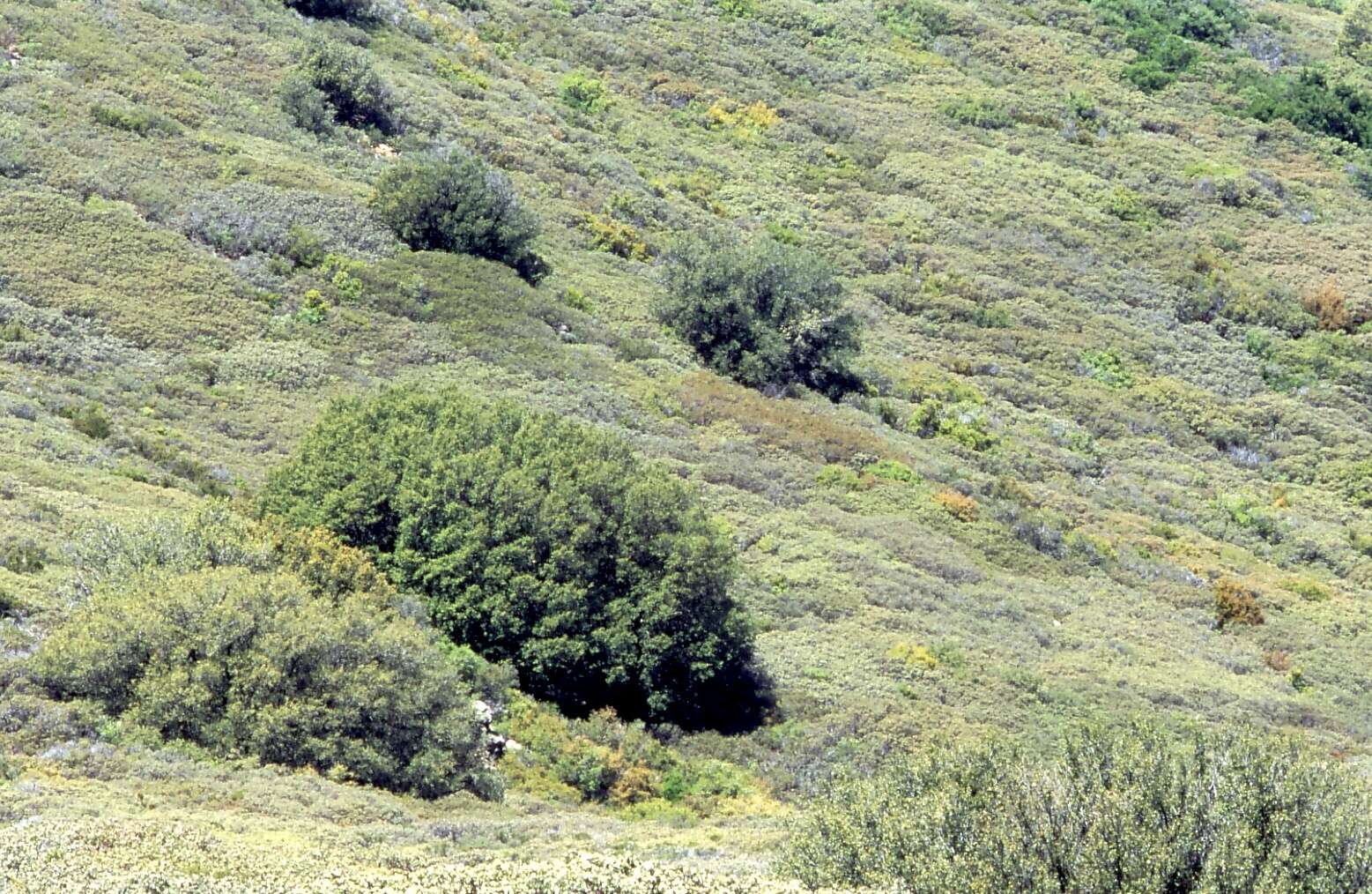
Old-growth chaparral more than a century old

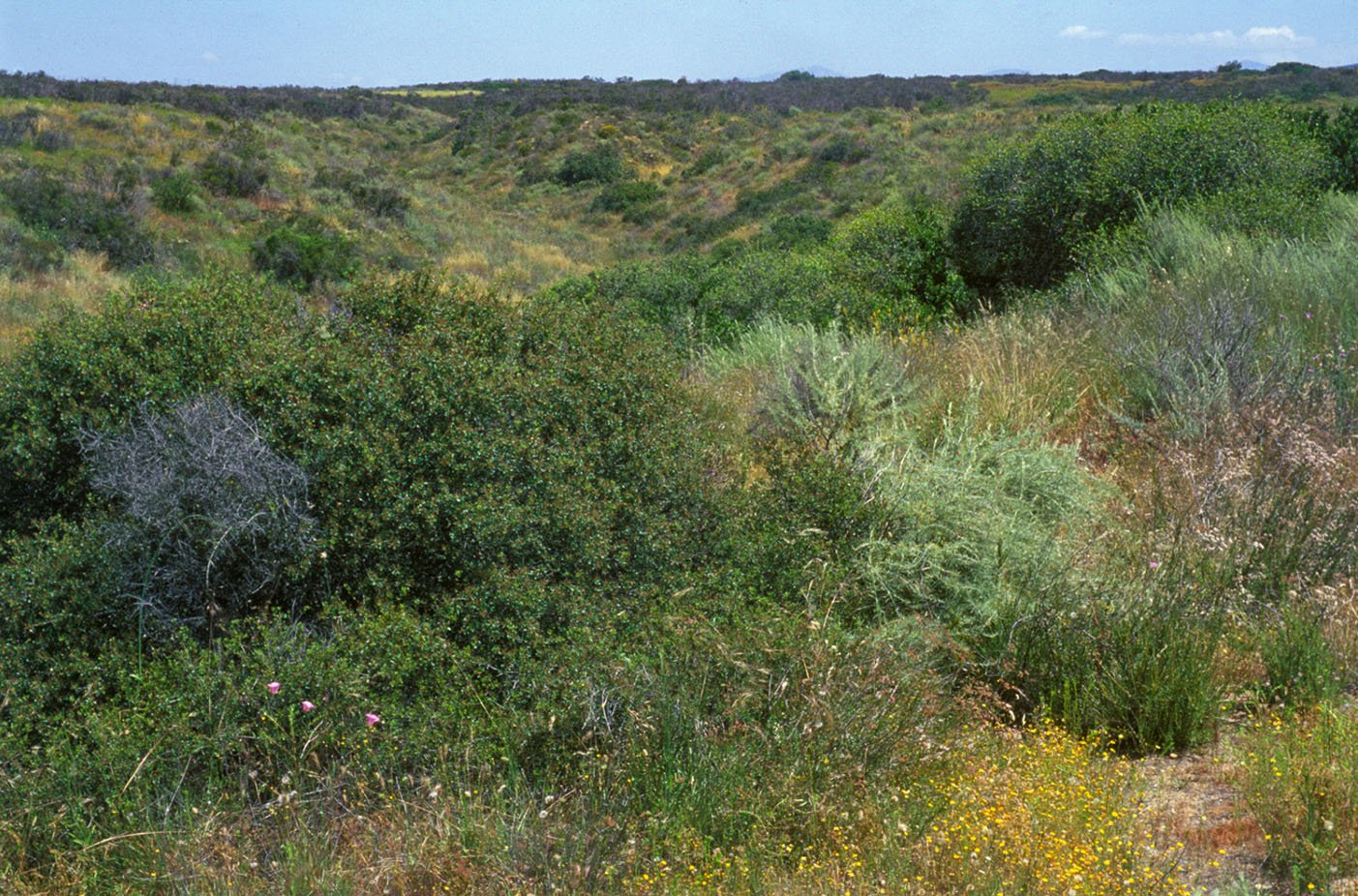
Coastal sage scrub in San Diego County

The California chaparral and woodlands ecoregion, of the Mediterranean forests, woodlands, and scrub biome, has three sub-ecoregions with ecosystem–plant community subdivisions:

- California coastal sage and chaparral:
  In coastal Southern California and northwestern coastal Baja California, as well as all of the Channel Islands off California and Guadalupe Island (Mexico).
- California montane chaparral and woodlands:
  In southern and central coast adjacent and inland California regions, including covering some of the mountains of the California Coast Ranges, the Transverse Ranges, and the western slopes of the northern Peninsular Ranges.
- California interior chaparral and woodlands:
  In central interior California surrounding the Central Valley, covering the foothills and lower slopes of the northeastern Transverse Ranges and the western Sierra Nevada range.

Some indicator plants of the California chaparral and woodlands ecoregion include:

- Quercus species – oaks:
  - Quercus agrifolia – coast live oak
  - Quercus berberidifolia – scrub oak
  - Quercus chrysolepis – canyon live oak
  - Quercus douglasii – blue oak
  - Quercus wislizeni – interior live oak
- Artemisia species – sagebrush:
  - Artemisia californica – California sagebrush, coastal sage brush
- Arctostaphylos species – manzanitas:
  - Arctostaphylos glauca – bigberry manzanita
  - Arctostaphylos manzanita – common manzanita
- Ceanothus species – California lilacs:
  - Ceanothus cuneatus – buckbrush
  - Ceanothus megacarpus – bigpod ceanothus
- Rhus species – sumacs:
  - Rhus integrifolia – lemonade berry
  - Rhus ovata – sugar bush
- Eriogonum species – buckwheats:
  - Eriogonum fasciculatum – California buckwheat
- Salvia species – sages:
  - Salvia mellifera – Californian black sage

=== California cismontane and transmontane chaparral subdivisions ===
Another phytogeography system uses two California chaparral and woodlands subdivisions: the cismontane chaparral and the transmontane (desert) chaparral.

==== California cismontane chaparral ====
Cismontane chaparral ("this side of the mountain") refers to the chaparral ecosystem in the Mediterranean forests, woodlands, and scrub biome in California, growing on the western (and coastal) sides of large mountain range systems, such as the western slopes of the Sierra Nevada in the San Joaquin Valley foothills, western slopes of the Peninsular Ranges and California Coast Ranges, and south-southwest slopes of the Transverse Ranges in the Central Coast and Southern California regions.

===== Cismontane chaparral plant species =====
In Central and Southern California chaparral forms a dominant habitat. Members of the chaparral biota native to California, all of which tend to regrow quickly after fires, include:

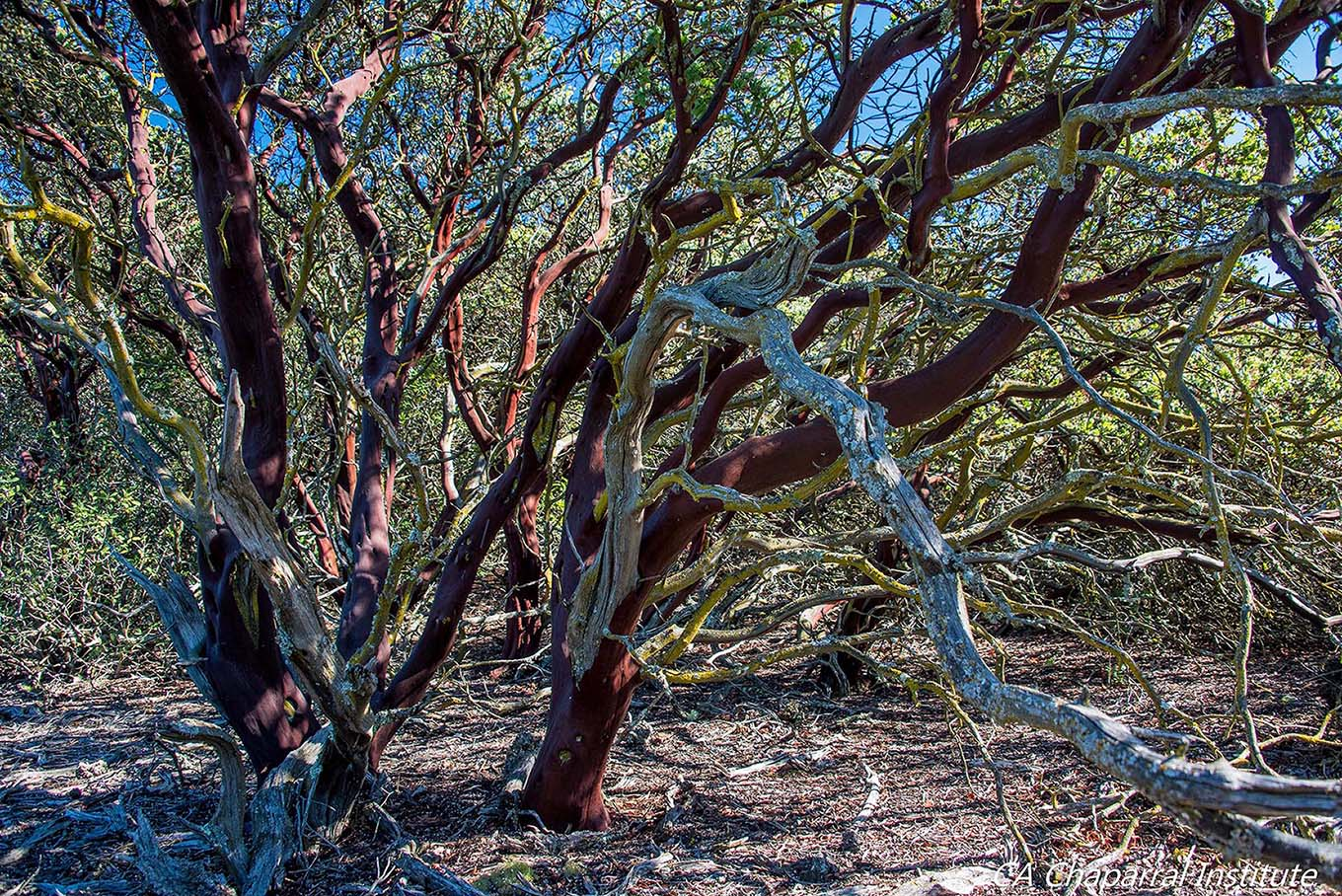
An old-growth manzanita, a classic member of the chaparral plant community

- Adenostoma fasciculatum, chamise
- Adenostoma sparsifolium, redshanks
- Arctostaphylos spp., manzanita
- Ceanothus spp., ceanothus
- Cercocarpus spp., mountain mahogany
- Cneoridium dumosum, bush rue
- Eriogonum fasciculatum, California buckwheat
- Garrya spp., silk-tassel bush
- Hesperoyucca whipplei, yucca
- Heteromeles arbutifolia, toyon
- Acmispon glaber, deerweed
- Malosma laurina, laurel sumac
- Marah macrocarpus, wild cucumber
- Mimulus aurantiacus, bush monkeyflower
- Pickeringia montana, chaparral pea
- Prunus ilicifolia, islay or hollyleaf cherry
- Quercus berberidifolia, scrub oak
- Q. dumosa, scrub oak
- Q. wislizenii var. frutescens
- Rhamnus californica, California coffeeberry
- Rhus integrifolia, lemonade berry
- Rhus ovata, sugar bush
- Salvia apiana, Californian white sage
- Salvia mellifera, Californian black sage
- Xylococcus bicolor, mission manzanita

===== Cismontane chaparral bird species =====
The complex ecology of chaparral habitats supports a very large number of animal species. The following is a short list of birds which are an integral part of the cismontane chaparral ecosystems.

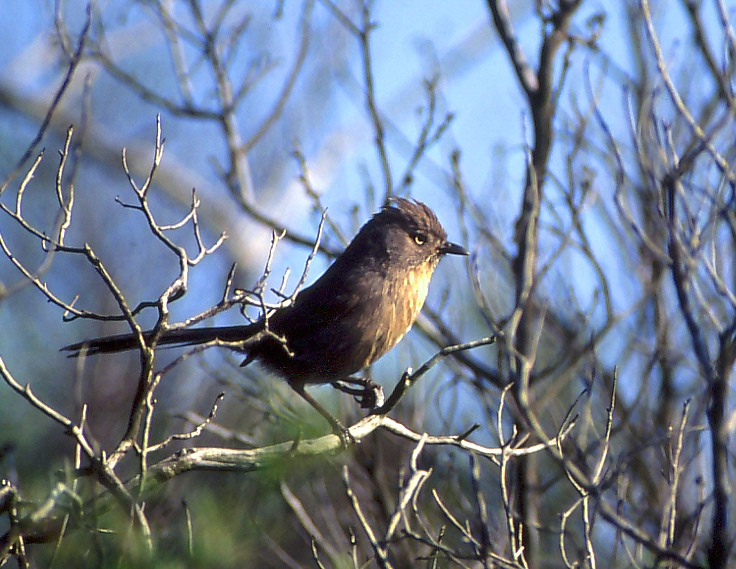
Wrentit, the most characteristic bird of the chaparral

Characteristic chaparral bird species include:

- Wrentit (Chamaea fasciata)
- California thrasher (Toxostoma redivivum)
- California towhee (Melozone crissalis)
- Spotted towhee (Pipilo maculatus)
- California scrub jay (Aphelocoma californica)

Other common chaparral bird species include:

- Anna's hummingbird (Calypte anna)
- Bewick's wren (Thryomanes bewickii)
- Bushtit (Psaltriparus minimus)
- Costa's hummingbird (Calypte costae)
- Greater roadrunner (Geococcyx californianus)

==== California transmontane (desert) chaparral ====
Transmontane chaparral or desert chaparral—transmontane ("the other side of the mountain") chaparral—refers to the desert shrubland habitat and chaparral plant community growing in the rainshadow of these ranges. Transmontane chaparral features xeric desert climate, not Mediterranean climate habitats, and is also referred to as desert chaparral. Desert chaparral is a regional ecosystem subset of the deserts and xeric shrublands biome, with some plant species from the California chaparral and woodlands ecoregion. Unlike cismontane chaparral, which forms dense, impenetrable stands of plants, desert chaparral is often open, with only about 50% of the ground covered. Individual shrubs can reach up to 10 feet (3.0 m) in height.

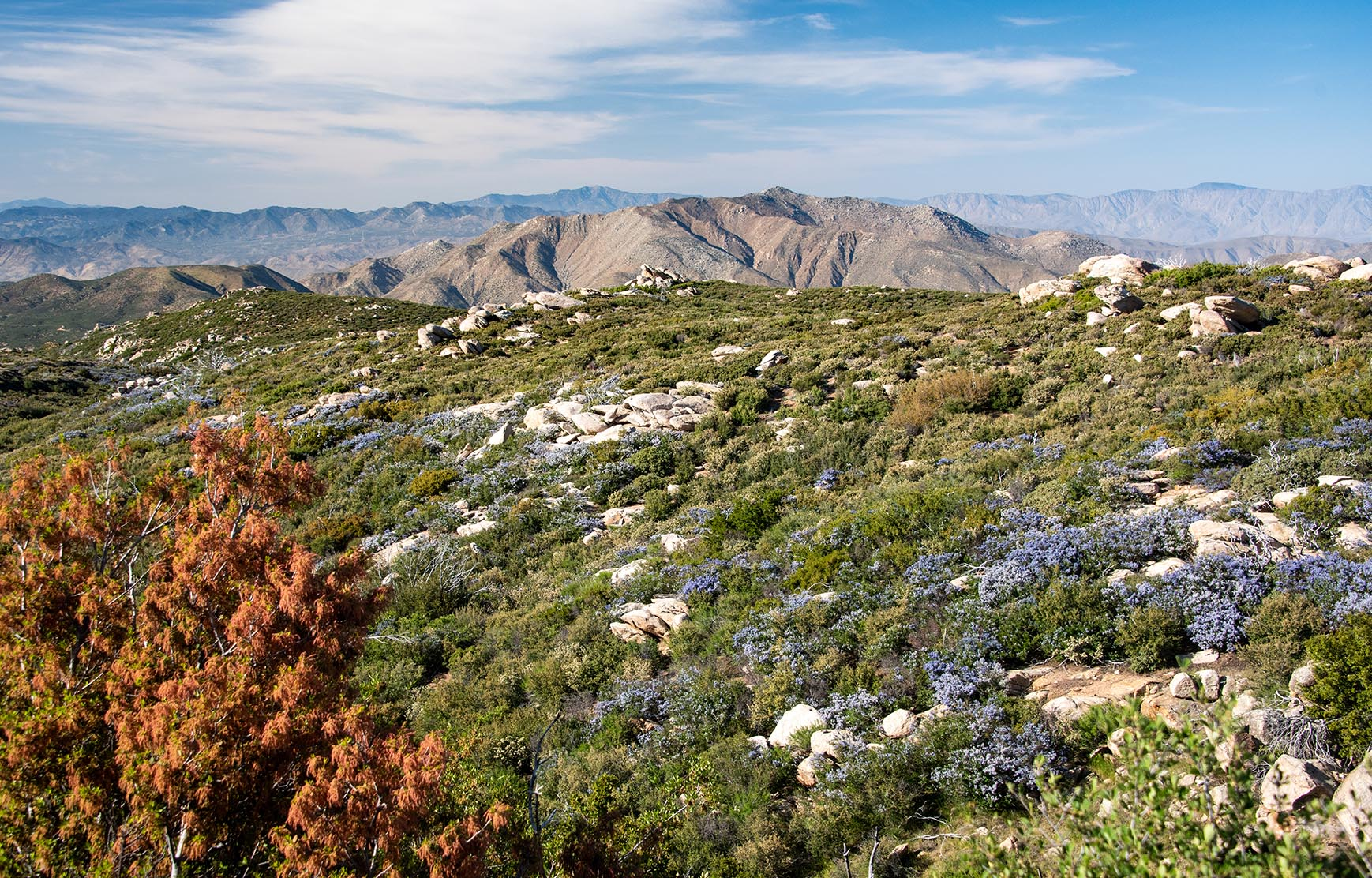
Transmontane chaparral in the Laguna Mountains, Cleveland National Forest

Transmontane chaparral or desert chaparral is found on the eastern slopes of major mountain range systems on the western sides of the deserts of California. The mountain systems include the southeastern Transverse Ranges (the San Bernardino and San Gabriel Mountains) in the Mojave Desert north and northeast of the Los Angeles Basin and Inland Empire; and the northern Peninsular Ranges (San Jacinto, Santa Rosa, and Laguna Mountains), which separate the Colorado Desert (western Sonoran Desert) from lower coastal Southern California. It is distinguished from the cismontane chaparral found on the coastal side of the mountains, which experiences higher winter rainfall. Naturally, desert chaparral experiences less winter rainfall than cismontane chaparral. Plants in this community are characterized by small, hard (sclerophyllic) evergreen (non-deciduous) leaves. Desert chaparral grows above California's desert cactus scrub plant community and below the pinyon–juniper woodland. It is further distinguished from the deciduous sub-alpine scrub above the pinyon–juniper woodlands on the same side of the Peninsular ranges.

Due to the lower annual rainfall (resulting in slower plant growth rates) when compared to cismontane chaparral, desert chaparral is more vulnerable to biodiversity loss and the invasion of non-native weeds and grasses if disturbed by human activity and frequent fire.

===== Transmontane chaparral distribution =====
Transmontane (desert) chaparral typically grows on the lower (3,500–4,500 feet or 1,100–1,400 metres elevation) northern slopes of the southern Transverse Ranges (running east to west in San Bernardino and Los Angeles counties) and on the lower (2,500–3,500 ft or 760–1,070 m) eastern slopes of the Peninsular Ranges (running south to north from lower Baja California to Riverside and Orange counties and the Transverse Ranges). It can also be found in higher-elevation sky islands in the interior of the deserts, such as in the upper New York Mountains within the Mojave National Preserve in the Mojave Desert.

The California transmontane (desert) chaparral is found in the rain shadow deserts of the following:

- Sierra Nevada creating the Great Basin Desert and northern Mojave Desert
- Transverse Ranges creating the western through eastern Mojave Desert
- Peninsular Ranges creating the Colorado Desert and Yuha Desert.

===== Transmontane chaparral plants =====
- Adenostoma fasciculatum, chamise (a low shrub common to most chaparral with clusters of tiny needle like leaves or fascicles; similar in appearance to coastal Eriogonum fasciculatum)
- Agave deserti, desert agave
- Arctostaphylos glauca, bigberry manzanita (smooth red bark with large edible berries; glauca means blue-green, the color of its leaves)
- Ceanothus greggii, desert ceanothus, California lilac (a nitrogen fixer, has hair on both sides of leaves for heat dissipation)
- Cercocarpus ledifolius, curl leaf mountain mahogany, a nitrogen fixer and important food source for desert bighorn sheep
- Dendromecon rigida, bush poppy (a fire follower with four petaled yellow flowers)
- Ephedra spp., Mormon teas
- Fremontodendron californicum, California flannel bush (lobed leaves with fine coating of hair, covered with yellow blossoms in spring)
- Opuntia acanthocarpa, buckhorn cholla (branches resemble antlers of a deer)
- Opuntia echinocarpa, silver or golden cholla (depending on color of the spines)
- Opuntia phaeacantha, desert prickly pear (fruit is important food source for animals)
- Purshia tridentata, buckbrush, antelope bitterbrush (Rosaceae family)
- Prunus fremontii, desert apricot
- Prunus fasciculata, desert almond (commonly infested with tent caterpillars of Malacosoma spp.)
- Prunus ilicifolia, holly-leaf cherry
- Quercus cornelius-mulleri, desert scrub oak or Muller's oak
- Rhus ovata, sugar bush
- Simmondsia chinensis, jojoba
- Yucca schidigera, Mojave yucca
- Hesperoyucca whipplei (syn. Yucca whipplei), foothill yucca – our lord's candle

===== Transmontane chaparral animals =====
There is overlap of animals with those of the adjacent desert and pinyon-juniper communities.

- Canis latrans, coyote
- Lynx rufus, bobcat
- Neotoma sp., desert pack rat
- Odocoileus hemionus, mule deer
- Peromyscus truei, pinyon mouse
- Puma concolor, mountain lion
- Stagmomantis californica, California mantis

== Fire ==
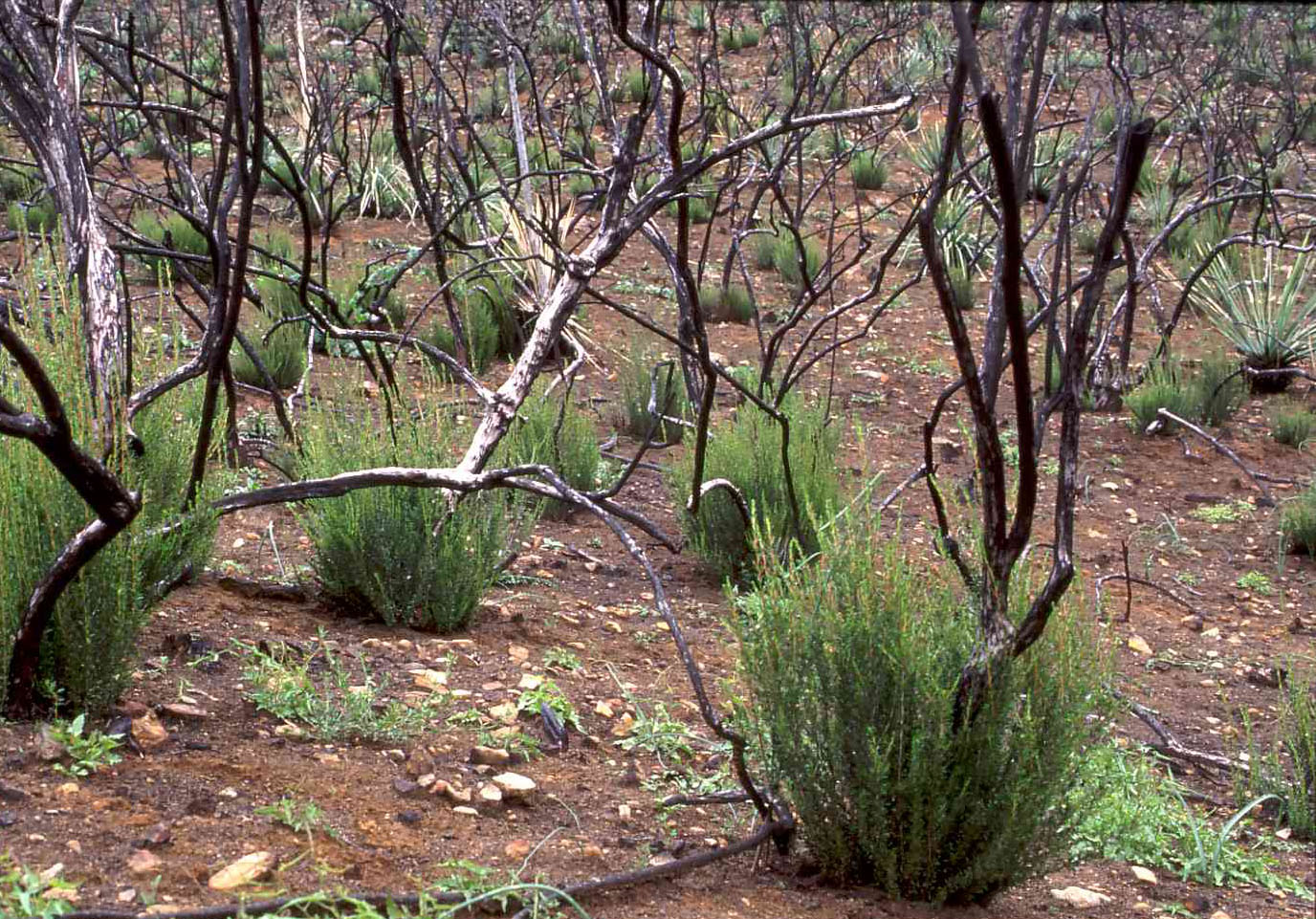
Chamise (Adenostoma fasciculatum) resprouting after a high-intensity chaparral fire

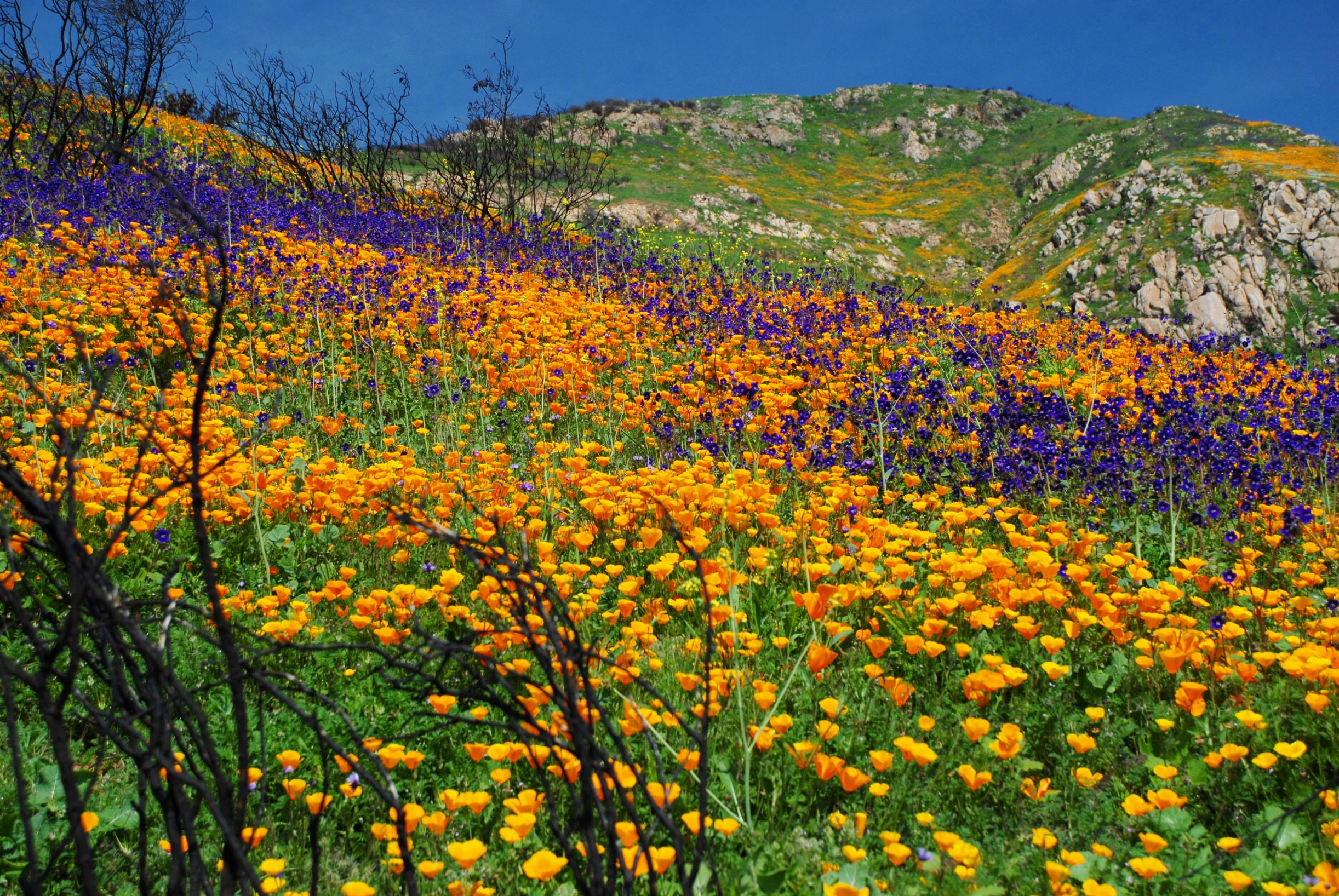
Wildflower display after the 2007 Witch Creek Fire, San Diego County, California

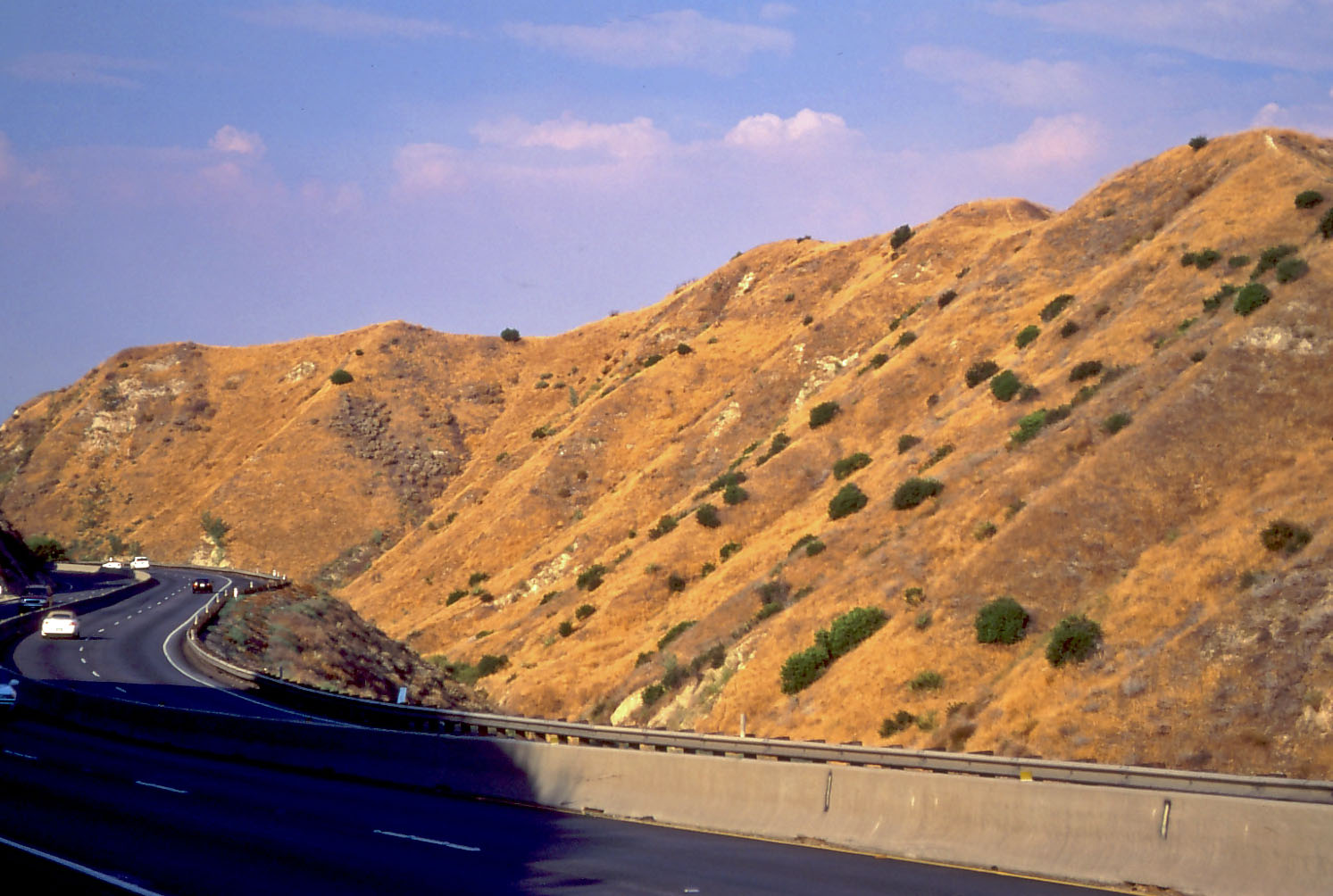
Impact of high fire frequency: chaparral/sage scrub type converted to non-native grassland

Chaparral is a coastal biome with hot, dry summers and mild, rainy winters. The chaparral area receives about 38–100 cm (15–39 in) of precipitation a year. This makes the chaparral most vulnerable to fire in the late summer and fall.

The chaparral ecosystem as a whole is adapted to be able to recover from naturally infrequent, high-intensity fire (fires occurring between 30 and 150 years or more apart); indeed, chaparral regions are known culturally and historically for their impressive fires. (This does create a conflict with human development adjacent to and expanding into chaparral systems.) Additionally, Native Americans burned chaparral near villages on the coastal plain to promote plant species for textiles and food. Before a major fire, typical chaparral plant communities are dominated by manzanita, chamise Adenostoma fasciculatum and Ceanothus species, toyon (which can sometimes be interspersed with scrub oaks), and other drought-resistant shrubs with hard (sclerophyllous) leaves; these plants resprout (see resprouter) from underground burls after a fire.

Plants that are long-lived in the seed bank or serotinous with induced germination after fire include chamise, Ceanothus, and fiddleneck. Some chaparral plant communities may grow so dense and tall that it becomes difficult for large animals and humans to penetrate, but may be teeming with smaller fauna in the understory. The seeds of many chaparral plant species are stimulated to germinate by some fire cue (heat or the chemicals from smoke or charred wood). During the time shortly after a fire, chaparral communities may contain soft-leaved herbaceous, fire following annual wildflowers and short-lived perennials that dominate the community for the first few years – until the burl resprouts and seedlings of chaparral shrub species create a mature, dense overstory. Seeds of annuals and shrubs lie dormant until the next fire creates the conditions needed for germination.

Several shrub species such as Ceanothus fix nitrogen, increasing the availability of nitrogen compounds in the soil.

Because of the hot, dry conditions that exist in the California summer and fall, chaparral is one of the most fire-prone plant communities in North America. Some fires are caused by lightning, but these are usually during periods of high humidity and low winds and are easily controlled. Nearly all of the very large wildfires are caused by human activity during periods of hot, dry easterly Santa Ana winds. These human-caused fires are commonly ignited by power line failures, vehicle fires and collisions, sparks from machinery, arson, or campfires.

=== Threatened by high fire frequency ===
Though adapted to infrequent fires, chaparral plant communities can be eliminated by frequent fires. A high frequency of fire (less than 10-15 years apart) will result in the loss of obligate seeding shrub species such as Manzanita spp. This high frequency disallows seeder plants to reach their reproductive size before the next fire and the community shifts to a sprouter-dominance. If high frequency fires continue over time, obligate resprouting shrub species can also be eliminated by exhausting their energy reserves below-ground. Today, frequent accidental ignitions can convert chaparral from a native shrubland to non-native annual grassland and drastically reduce species diversity, especially under drought brought about by climate change.

=== Invasive species effects on soil composition post and pre fire ===
Invasive species impact the chaparral ecosystem in many ways; they inhibit the re-establishment of native species, promote shorter term fire frequency, and change chemical composition of soils which ultimately impedes native species success. Annual Invasion on chaparral environments leads to lower levels of readily available Nitrogen (N) for native plants, affects the Carbon-to-Nitrogen ratio (C/N), develops shallow fine root systems, creates more litter and aboveground biomass and can increase soil respiration. Native plants rely on nitrogen to grow so when non natives invade they take this away hindering plant growth. High frequency fire due to invasive grasses increase the amount of Nitrogen lost due to volatilization, as nitrogen is lost more consistently native shrubs struggle due to lower than normal nitrogen levels. Non-Native invasive such as grasses tend to have shallower root systems that outcompete natives such as Manzanita, Chamise and Ceanothus. Since invasive grasses root systems are much shallower they reduce soil moisture at the top level of the soil, this greatly reduces the prosperity of re establishing native seedlings. Increased plant litter and biomass aboveground crowd out natives and change desirable soil compositions.

Plant litter when decomposed brings vital nutrients such as carbon into the below soil. Invasive grasses produce litter with less recalcitrant carbon in turn resulting in less carbon intrusion. Recalcitrant carbon is found in higher quantities and quality in native shrubs litter, recalcitrant carbon takes longer to break down and is resistant to decomposing so it can stay in the soil for centuries. Chaparral provides vital carbon sinks for the environment; when invasive grasses move in after short frequency fires, there is less carbon storage and more carbon set free into the atmosphere.

To combat these non-native invasions and potentially balance degraded soils, techniques such as weeding and seeding along with hydro seeding can prove effective. Weeding and re seeding native species takes away competition after disturbances and allows native species to increase density. Post fire Carbon and Nitrogen levels greatly decrease and hydro seeding can help bring these levels back to what they were pre fire. Although hydro seeding can help balance these levels, hydro seeding opens the possibility of introducing invasive species and has potential long lasting effects on Carbon and Nitrogen cycles in chaparral ecosystems.

=== Wildfire debate ===
There are two older hypotheses relating to California chaparral fire regimes that caused considerable debate in the past within the fields of wildfire ecology and land management. Research over the past two decades have rejected these hypotheses:

1. That older stands of chaparral become "senescent" or "decadent", thus implying that fire is necessary for the plants to remain healthy,
2. That wildfire suppression policies have allowed dead chaparral to accumulate unnaturally, creating ample fuel for large fires.

The perspective that older chaparral is unhealthy or unproductive may have originated during the 1940s when studies were conducted measuring the amount of forage available to deer populations in chaparral stands. However, according to recent studies, California chaparral is extraordinarily resilient to very long periods without fire and continues to maintain productive growth throughout pre-fire conditions. Seeds of many chaparral plants actually require 30 years or more worth of accumulated leaf litter before they will successfully germinate (e.g., scrub oak, Quercus berberidifolia; toyon, Heteromeles arbutifolia; and holly-leafed cherry, Prunus ilicifolia). When intervals between fires drop below 10 to 15 years, many chaparral species are eliminated and the system is typically replaced by non-native, invasive, weedy grassland.

The idea that older chaparral is responsible for causing large fires was originally proposed in the 1980s by comparing wildfires in Baja California and southern California. It was suggested that fire suppression activities in southern California allowed more fuel to accumulate, which in turn led to larger fires. This is similar to the observation that fire suppression and other human-caused disturbances in dry, ponderosa pine forests in the Southwest of the United States has unnaturally increased forest density. Historically, mixed-severity fires likely burned through these forests every decade or so, burning understory plants, small trees, and downed logs at low-severity, and patches of trees at high-severity. However, chaparral has a high-intensity crown-fire regime, meaning that fires consume nearly all the above ground growth whenever they burn, with a historical frequency of 30 to 150 years or more. A detailed analysis of historical fire data concluded that fire suppression activities have been ineffective at excluding fire from southern California chaparral, unlike in ponderosa pine forests. In addition, the number of fires is increasing in step with population growth and exacerbated by climate change. Chaparral stand age does not have a significant correlation to its tendency to burn.

Large, infrequent, high-intensity wildfires are part of the natural fire regime for California chaparral. Extreme weather conditions (low humidity, high temperature, high winds), drought, and low fuel moisture are the primary factors in determining how large a chaparral fire becomes.

== See also ==
- California Chaparral Institute
- Garrigue
- Heath
- International Association of Wildland Fire
- Keystone species
- Rewilding

== Bibliography ==
- Haidinger, T.L., and J.E. Keeley. 1993. Role of high fire frequency in destruction of mixed chaparral. Madrono 40: 141–147.
- Halsey, R.W. 2008. Fire, Chaparral, and Survival in Southern California. Second Edition. Sunbelt Publications, San Diego, CA. 232 p.
- Hanes, T. L. 1971. Succession after fire in the chaparral of southern California. Ecol. Monographs 41: 27–52.
- Hubbard, R.F. 1986. Stand age and growth dynamics in chamise chaparral. Master's thesis, San Diego State University, San Diego, California.
- Keeley, J. E., C. J. Fotheringham, and M. Morais. 1999. Reexamining fire suppression impacts on brushland fire regimes. Science 284:1829–1832.
- Keeley, J.E. 1995. Future of California floristics and systematics: wildfire threats to the California flora. Madrono 42: 175–179.
- Keeley, J.E., A.H. Pfaff, and H.D. Stafford. 2005. Fire suppression impacts on postfire recovery of Sierra Nevada chaparral shrublands. International Journal of Wildland Fire 14: 255–265.
- Larigauderie, A., T.W. Hubbard, and J. Kummerow. 1990. Growth dynamics of two chaparral shrub species with time after fire. Madrono 37: 225–236.
- Minnich, R. A. 1983. Fire mosaics in southern California and northern Baja California. Science 219:1287–1294.
- Moritz, M.A., J.E. Keeley, E.A. Johnson, and A.A. Schaffner. 2004. Testing a basic assumption of shrubland fire management: How important is fuel age? Frontiers in Ecology and the Environment 2:67–72.
- Pratt, R. B., A. L. Jacobsen, A. R. Ramirez, A. M. Helms, C. A. Traugh, M. F. Tobin, M. S. Heffner, and S. D. Davis. 2013. Mortality of resprouting chaparral shrubs after a fire and during a record drought: physiological mechanisms and demographic consequences. Global Change Biology 20:893–907.
- Syphard, A. D., V. C. Radeloff, J. E. Keeley, T. J. Hawbaker, M. K. Clayton, S. I. Stewart, and R. B. Hammer. 2007. Human influence on California fire regimes. Ecological Applications 17:1388–1402.
- Vale, T. R. 2002. Fire, Native Peoples, and the Natural Landscape. Island Press, Washington, DC, USA.
- Venturas, M. D., E. D. MacKinnon, H. L. Dario, A. L. Jacobsen, R. B. Pratt, and S. D. Davis. 2016. Chaparral shrub hydraulic traits, size, and life history types relate to species mortality during California's historic drought of 2014. PLoS ONE 11(7): p.e0159145.
- Zedler, P.H. 1995. Fire frequency in southern California shrublands: biological effects and management options, pp. 101–112 in J.E. Keeley and T. Scott (eds.), Brushfires in California wildlands: ecology and resource management. International Association of Wildland Fire, Fairfield, Wash.
- Campbell, Neil A.; Brad Williamson; Robin J. Heyden (2006). Biology: Exploring Life. Boston, Massachusetts: Pearson Prentice Hall. ISBN 0-13-250882-6.
