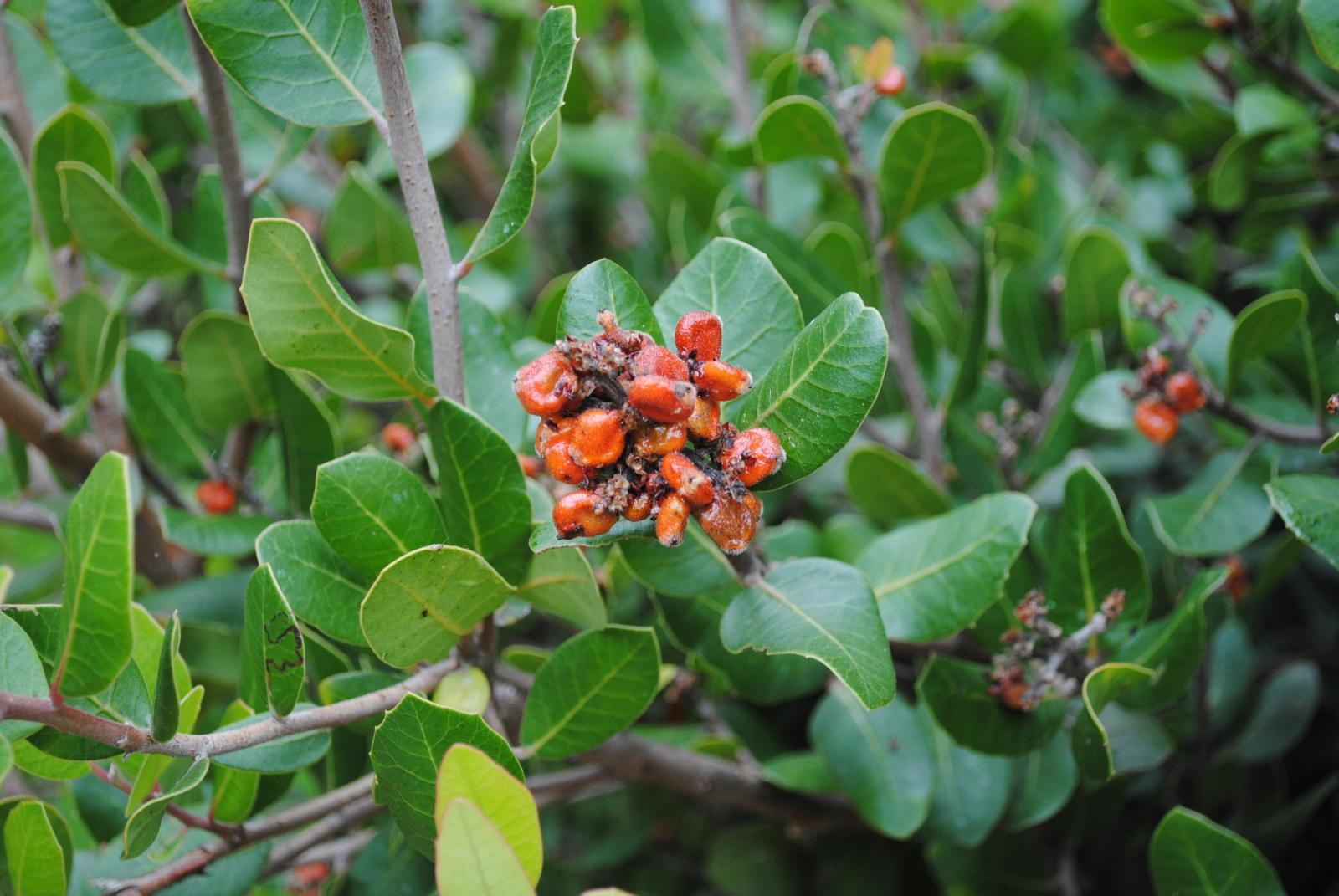
- Rhus integrifolia: Lemonade berry, fruit and leaves

Scientific classification
- Kingdom: Plantae
- Clade: Tracheophytes
- Clade: Angiosperms
- Clade: Eudicots
- Clade: Rosids
- Order: Sapindales
- Family: Anacardiaceae
- Genus: Rhus
- Species: R. integrifolia

Binomial name
- Rhus integrifolia (Nutt.) W.H.Brewer & S.Watson
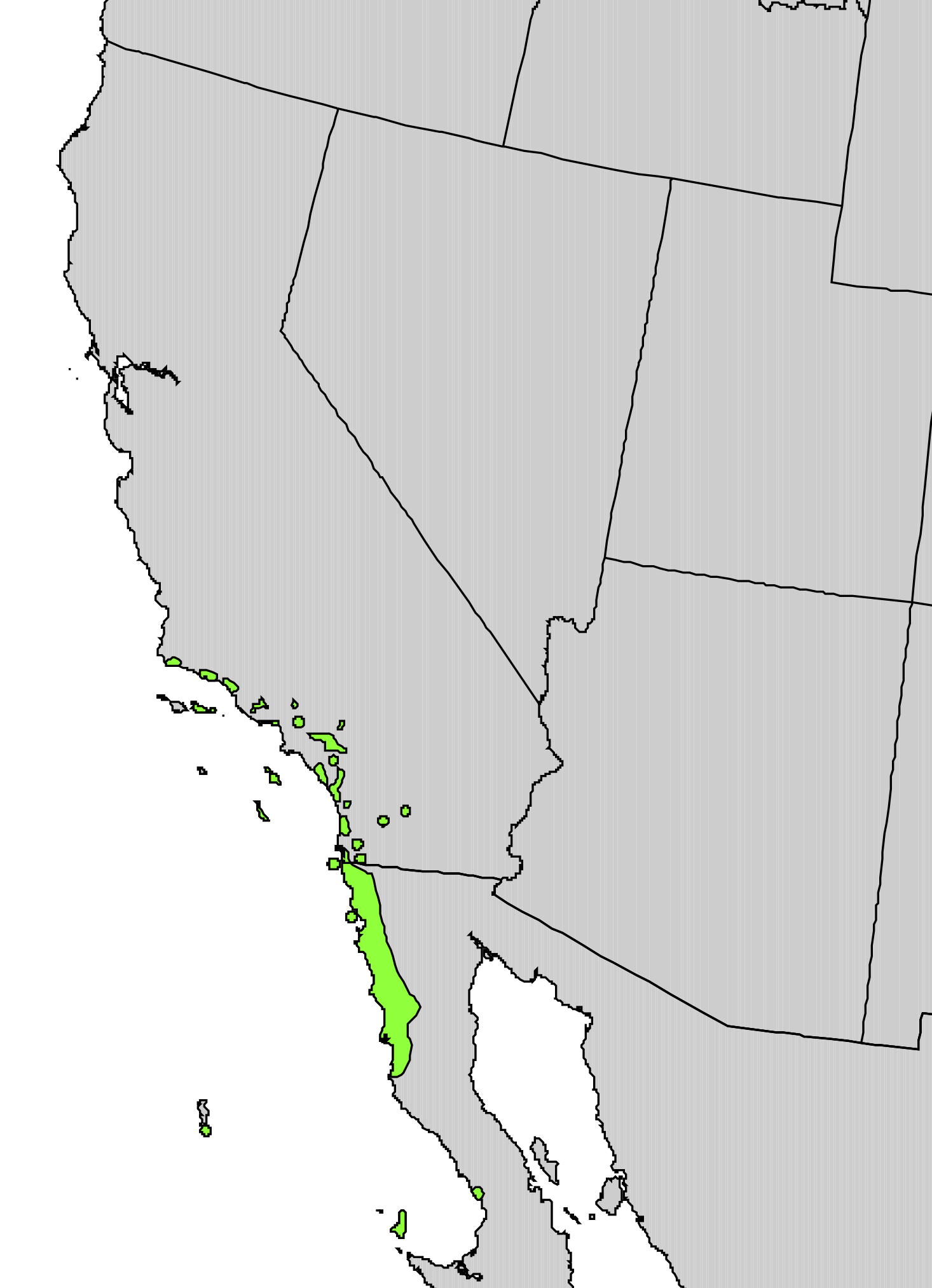
- Natural range

= Rhus integrifolia =

Lemonade berry

Species of shrub

Rhus integrifolia, also known as lemonade sumac, lemonade berry, or lemonadeberry, is a shrub to small tree in the sumac genus Rhus. It is native to the Transverse and Peninsular Ranges and the South Coast regions of Southern California. This extends from Santa Barbara County and the Channel Islands to San Diego County and extending into north-central Pacific coastal Baja California and its offshore islands such as Cedros Island.

It is 1–8 metres (3.3–26.2 ft) in height, with a sprawling form, and is a member of the chaparral plant community often found in canyons and on north-facing slopes below elevations of 900 metres (3,000 ft). Rhus integrifolia often hybridizes with Rhus ovata.

== Description ==
Rhus integrifolia leaves are simple (unusual in a genus where most species are trifoliate), alternating, evergreen and leathery, ranging from two to four centimeters wide on reddish twigs; length of leaves is five to seven centimeters. Leaves are toothed with a waxy smooth appearance above and a paler tone below. The flowers which appear from February to May are small, clustered closely together, and may be either bisexual or pistillate.

These fragrant flowers exhibit radial symmetry with five green sepals, five white to rosy-pink petals, and five stamens. The small flowers are only six millimeters across. The ovary is superior and usually has a single ovule; although in pistillate flowers, the stamens are small and infertile. The mature fruit of Rhus integrifolia is sticky, reddish, covered with hairs, and about seven to ten millimeters in diameter. The elliptical fruit presents tight clusters at the very ends of twigs.

Young plants manifest smooth reddish bark, while more mature individuals have cracked, even scaly, grayish bark with the smooth red bark displayed underneath. Twigs are rather stout and flexible, and reddish bud ends are diminutive and pointed. There is often a multi-furcate branching structure from the base of the plant. A mature plant is large and thicket-like with a sprawling arrangement.

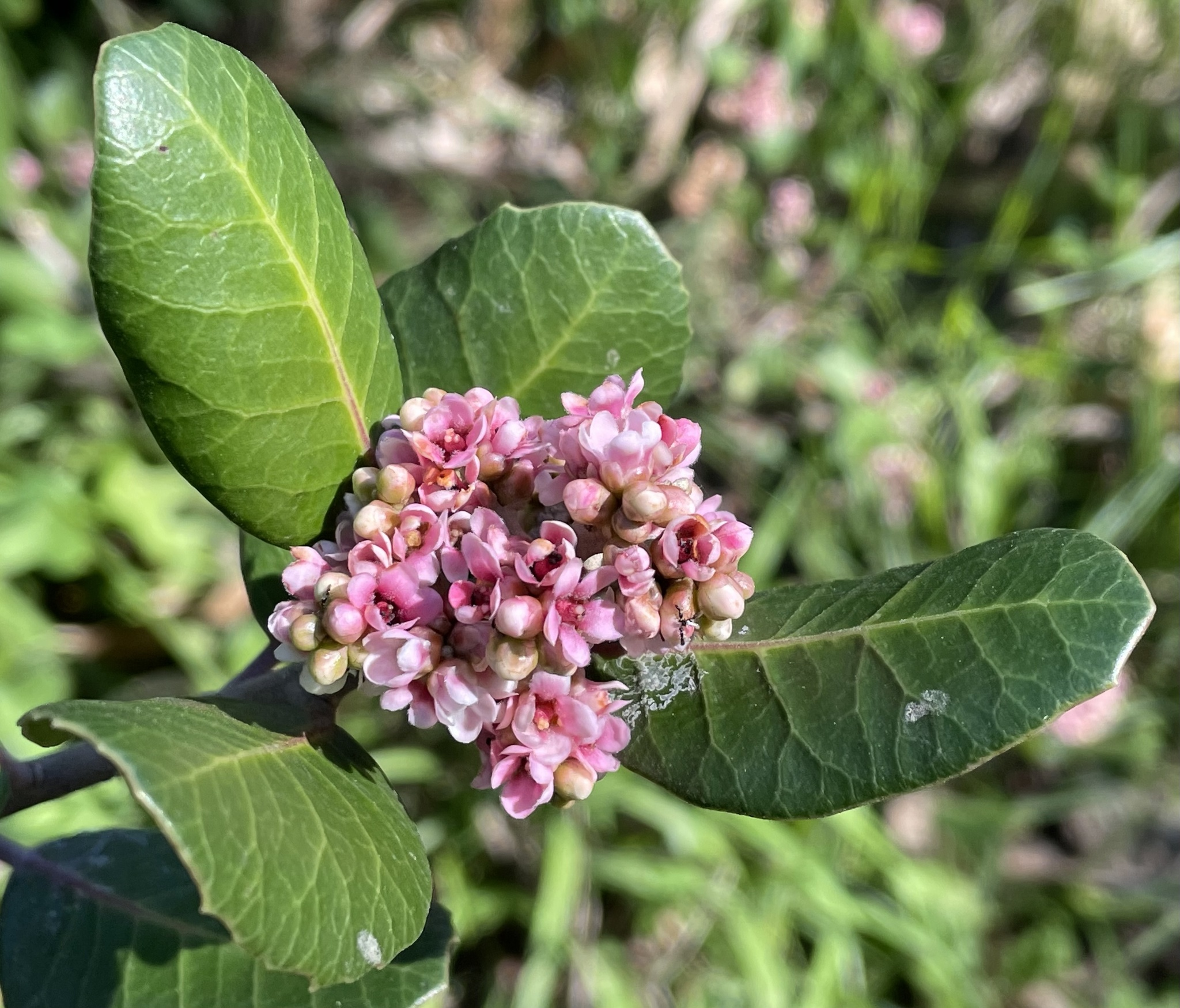
Flowers, Pottery Canyon Natural Park

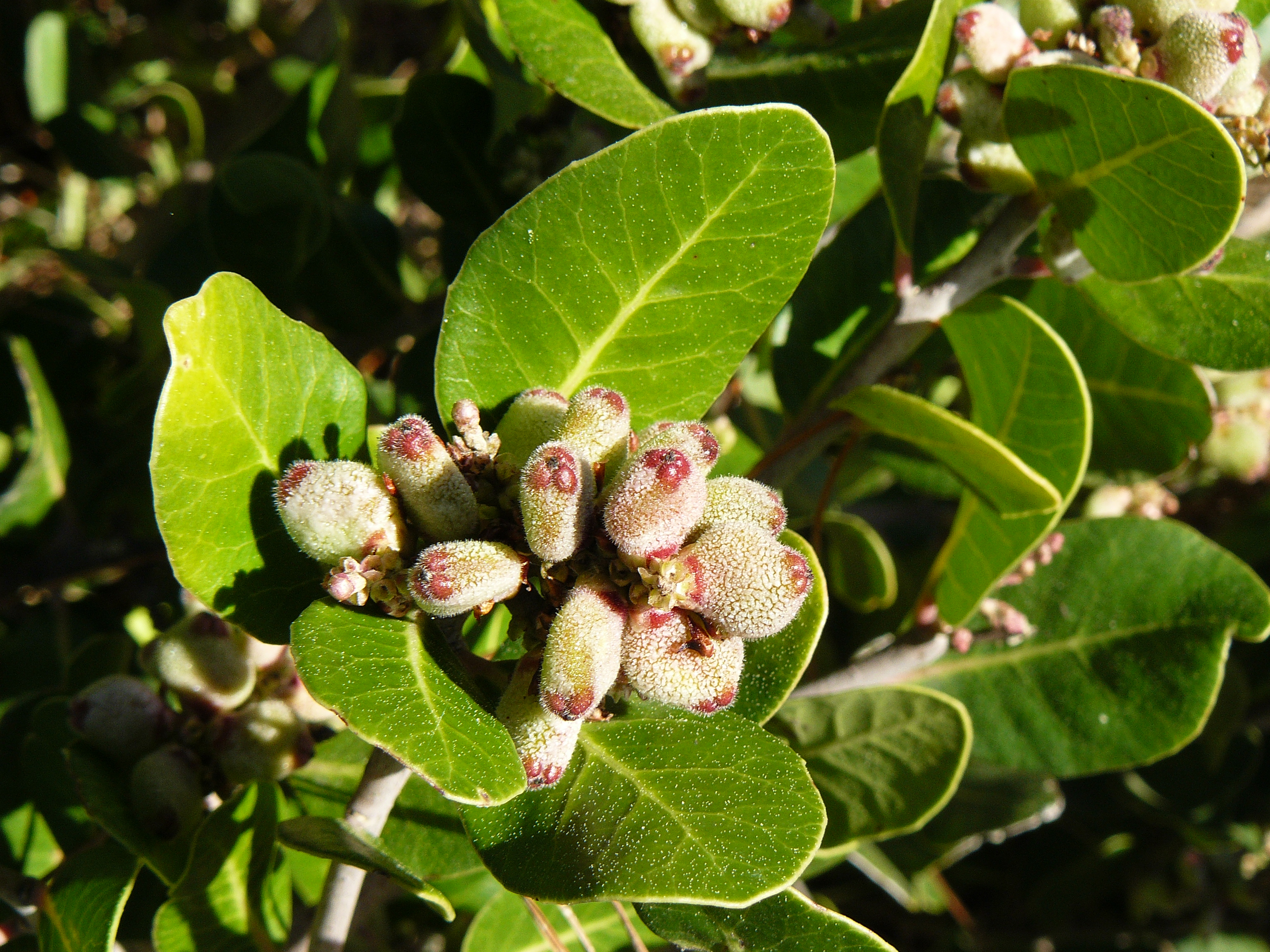
Young fruits, Morro Bay State Park

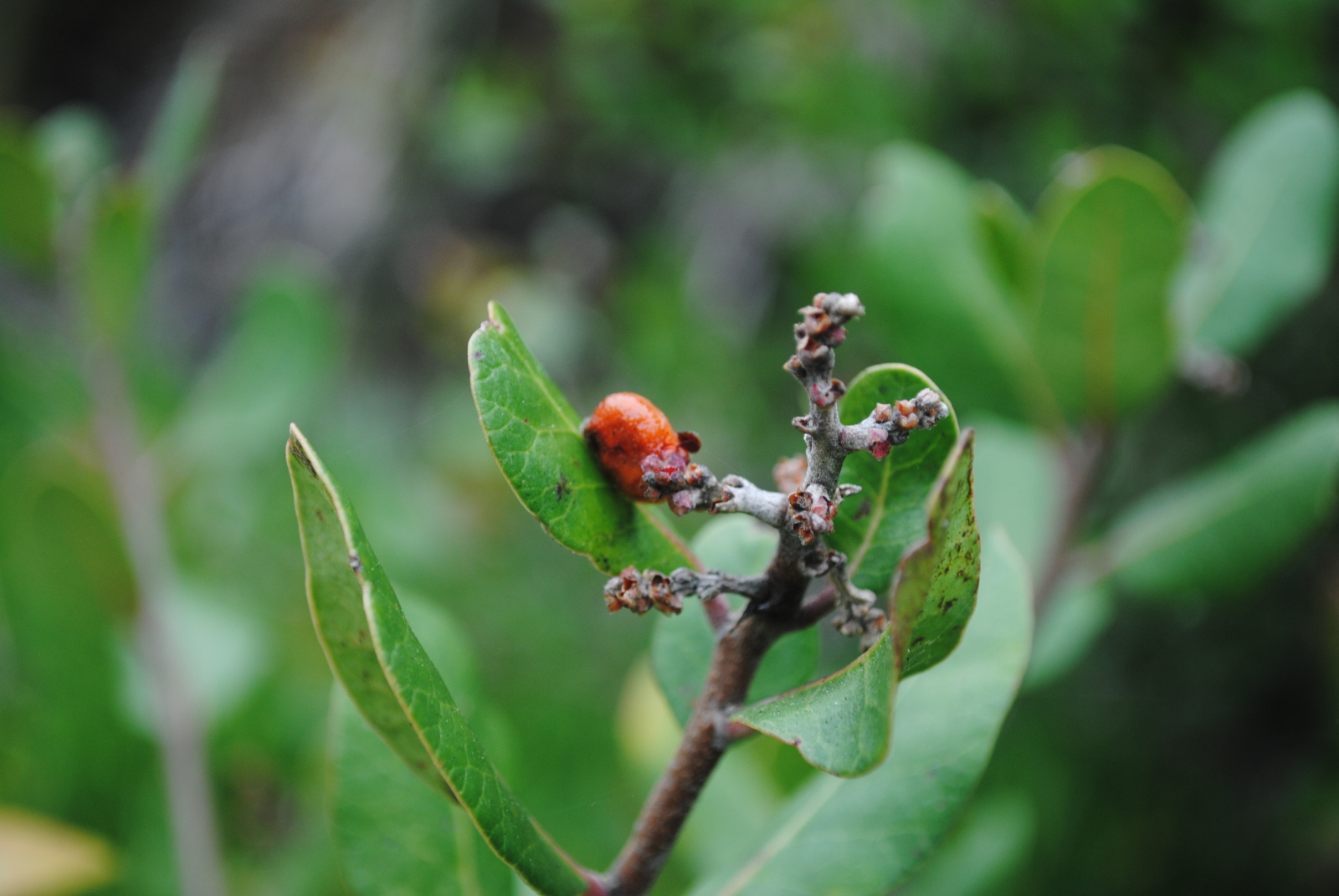
Single ripe fruit, Ruffin Canyon

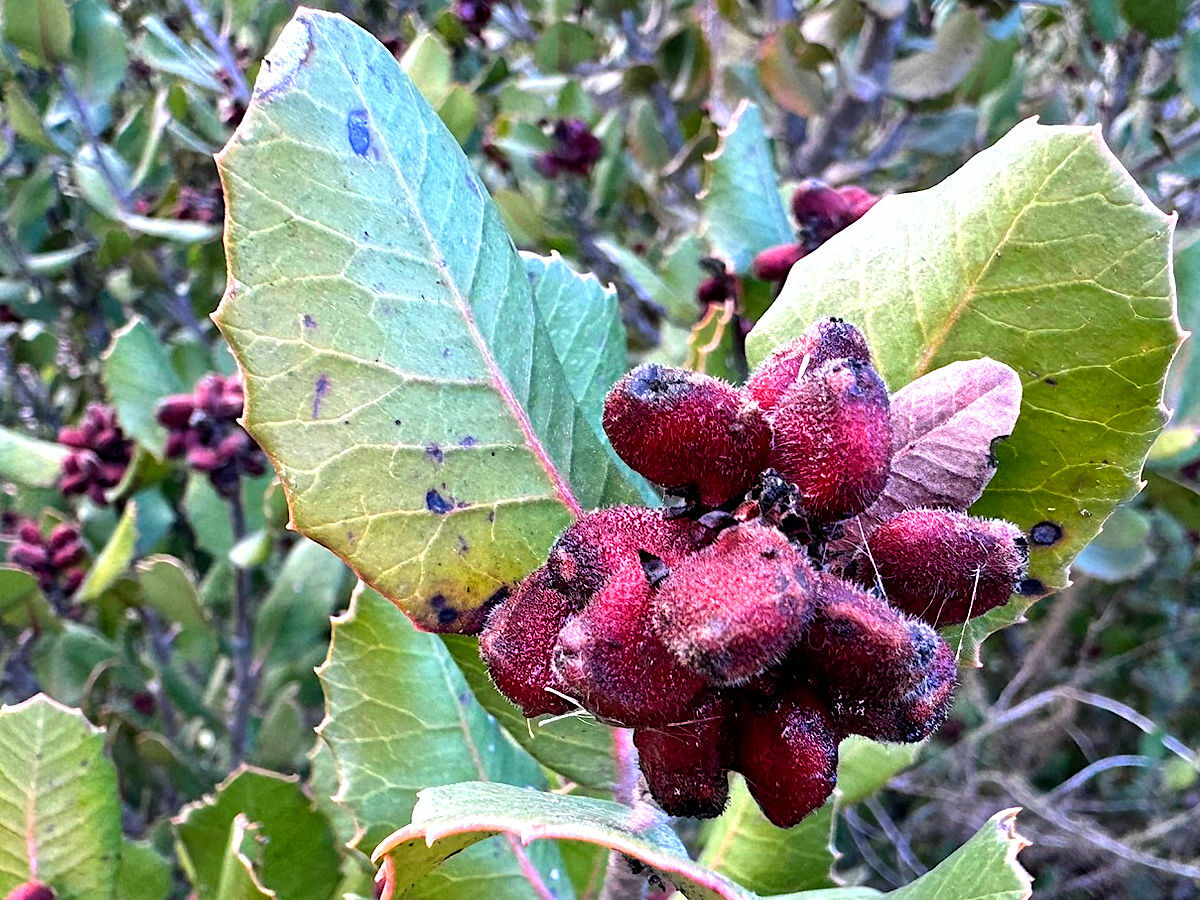
Ripe fruits, Mission Trails Regional Park

== Ecology ==
The lemonade berry plant is found on north and east-facing slopes and canyon floors in coastal areas of southern California and northern Baja California; however, one colony has even been observed as far north as Santa Cruz County. The lemonade berry occurs in both chaparral and coastal sage scrub communities.

This plant thrives on well-drained soils and endures heat and windy conditions well. The species tolerates sandy as well as medium loam soils, and it can even thrive in nutrient deficient soil. This plant tolerates mildly acid to mildly alkaline soils, and is common on north and east-facing slopes with where shady, moist conditions are prevalent. Propagation is by seed or by rhizome. Bird species enjoy the fruits and act as a major disperser.

Lemonade berry is not frost tolerant, but will hybridize with the frost tolerant Rhus ovata (sugarbush) in the foothills of California and Mexico where their ranges overlap.

== Uses ==
The berries (drupes) of this species can be used to make lemonade flavored drinks (hence its common name). Allergic reactions may also result from skin contact with sap from some of the genera.

Lemonade berry leaves are rich in tannins. Even though the species is evergreen, there is some leaf fall in autumn, at which time the fallen leaves may be used as a brown dye or mordant. An oil can be extracted from lemonade berry seeds; moreover, this oil achieves a tallow consistency when left to stand. Thereafter the oil can be employed to manufacture candles, which burn brightly, albeit emitting a pungent scent. The wood of mature plants is dense and hard, making it prized for wood-burning fireplace kindling.

=== Cultivation ===
Rhus integrifolia can also be used as a landscape shrub and is suitable for hedging and espalier. The plant is vulnerable to frost, but often the plant will regrow by summer, after it appears to have died from cold. The growth habit is slow to moderate and, as a garden plant, this species is quite resistant to deer, and supplies nectar and fruit for birds and nectar for butterflies. Its cultural requirements mimic its natural environment with ample drainage and little summer water.

== See also ==
- California chaparral and woodlands - (ecoregion)
- California coastal sage and chaparral - (subecoregion)
- Coastal sage scrub - (plant association)
- Xeriscape
