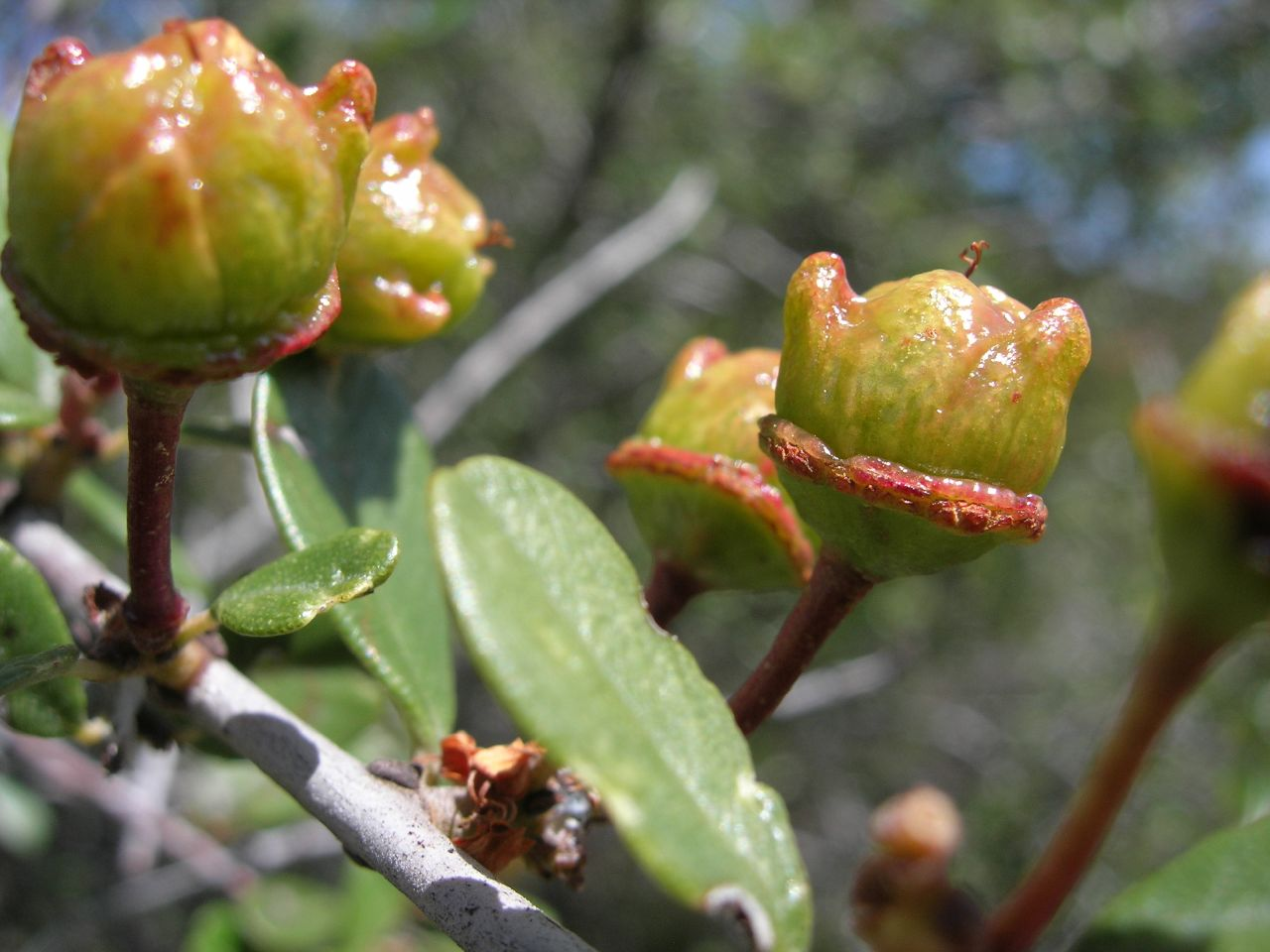
- Fruits

Scientific classification
- Kingdom: Plantae
- Clade: Tracheophytes
- Clade: Angiosperms
- Clade: Eudicots
- Clade: Rosids
- Order: Rosales
- Family: Rhamnaceae
- Genus: Ceanothus
- Species: C. megacarpus

Binomial name
- Ceanothus megacarpus Nutt.

= Ceanothus megacarpus =

Species of flowering plant

Ceanothus megacarpus is a species of flowering shrub known by the common name bigpod ceanothus. This Ceanothus is endemic to California, where its distribution extends along the Central Coast and includes the Channel Islands.

== Description ==
This shrub may exceed 3 meters in height and is covered in thick oval to nearly rectangular evergreen leaves. The inflorescences are small and sparse and are filled with small white to pale lavender flowers with dark centers. The fruit is a bumpy spherical red-green capsule about a centimeter wide. The inside of the capsule is divided into 3 valves, each valve holding a seed. The capsule dehisces neatly in three at the central band to release the seeds.
