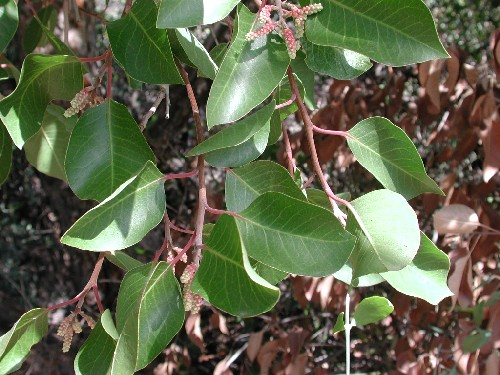

Scientific classification
- Kingdom: Plantae
- Clade: Tracheophytes
- Clade: Angiosperms
- Clade: Eudicots
- Clade: Rosids
- Order: Sapindales
- Family: Anacardiaceae
- Genus: Rhus
- Species: R. ovata

Binomial name
- Rhus ovata S.Watson
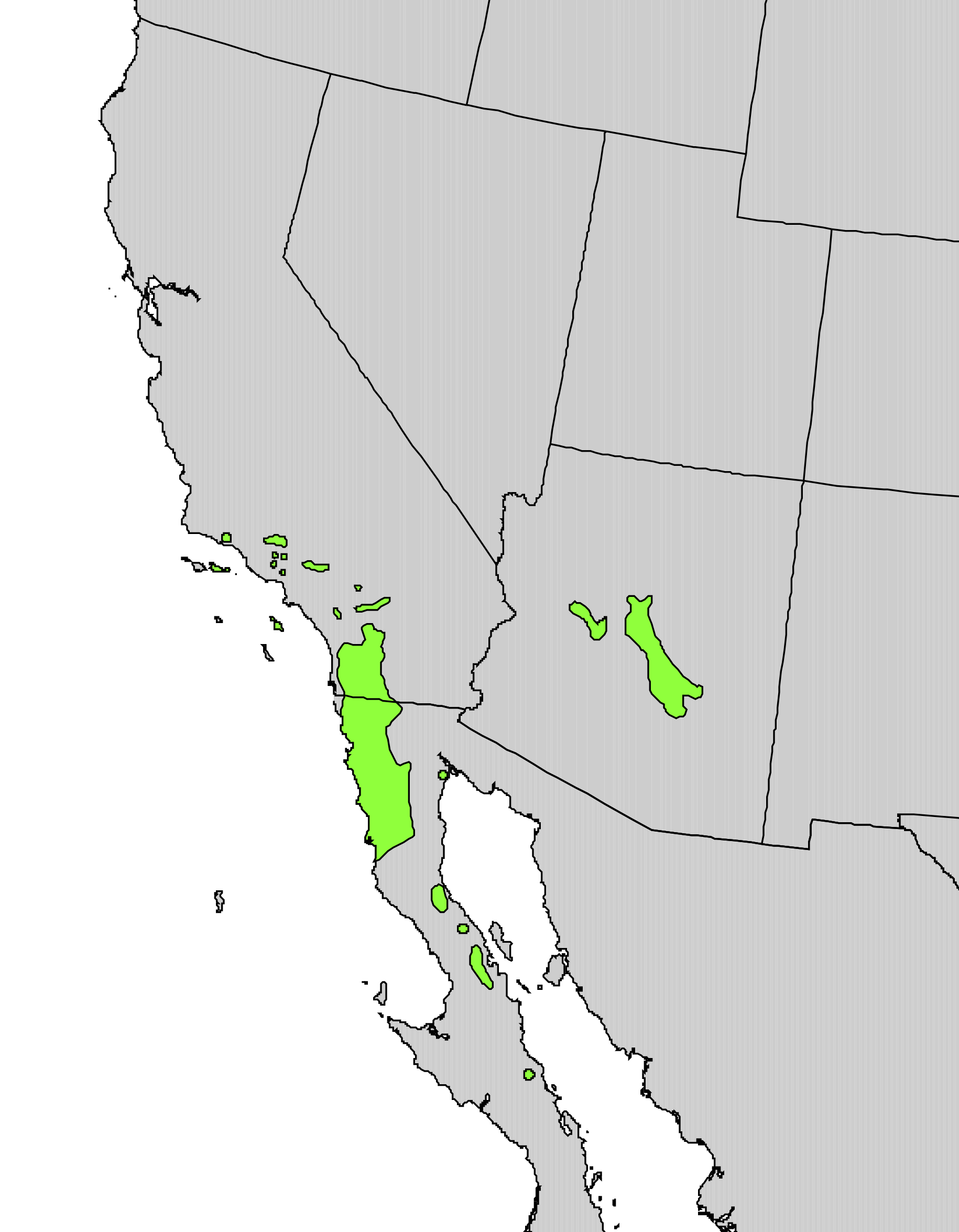
- Natural range

= Rhus ovata =

Species of tree

Rhus ovata, commonly known as sugar bush or sugar sumac, is a shrub or small tree found growing in the canyons and slopes of the chaparral and related ecosystems in Southern California, Arizona, Baja California and Baja California Sur. It is a long lived-plant, up to 100 years, and has dense evergreen foliage that make it conspicuous. It is closely related to and hybridizes with the lemonade sumac.

== Description ==
=== Morphology ===
This plant is a tall, wide woody shrub to small tree that ranges in height from 2–10 m (6.6–32.8 ft) with a rounded appearance. The stout twigs are thick and reddish when young. The foliage is suspended on a petiole 10–30 mm long. The leaves are 3 to 8 cm long, and roughly the same size in width, shaped broadly ovate to broadly elliptic, folded at the midrib, and have a leathery, glabrous texture. The leaf tips range from acute to acuminate, and the leaf margins are entire.

Flowers

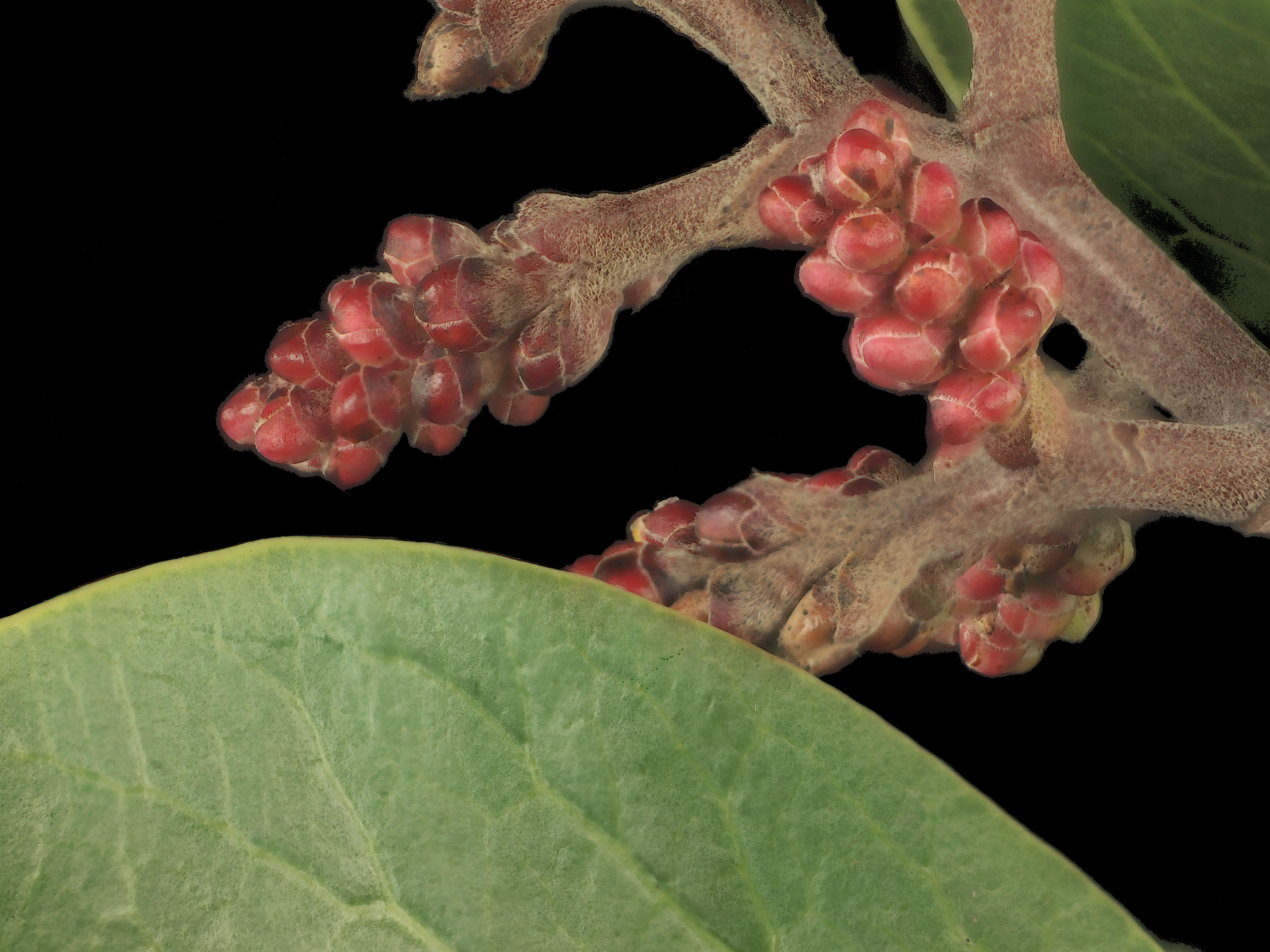
Detail of buds

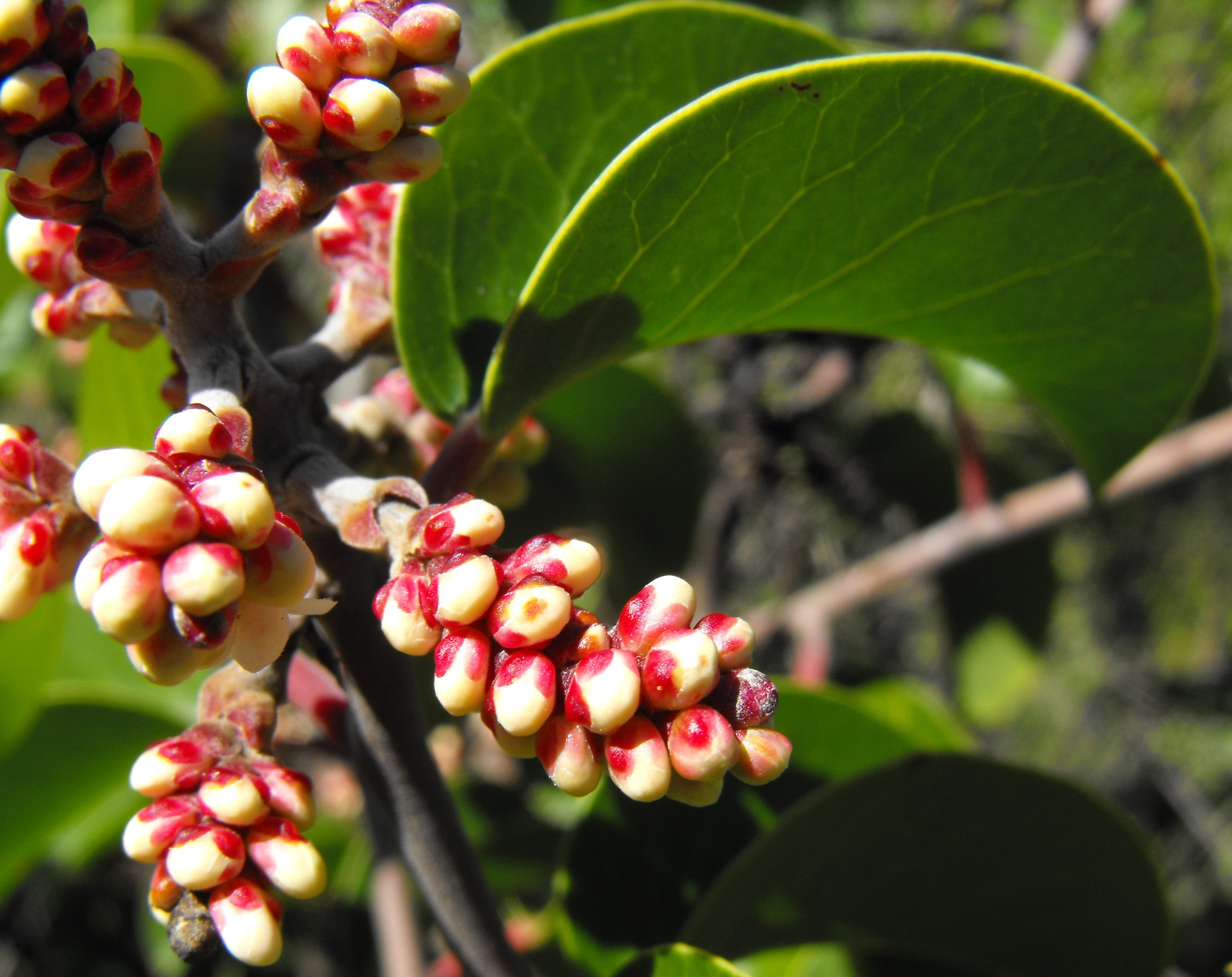
Flower buds at a later stage.

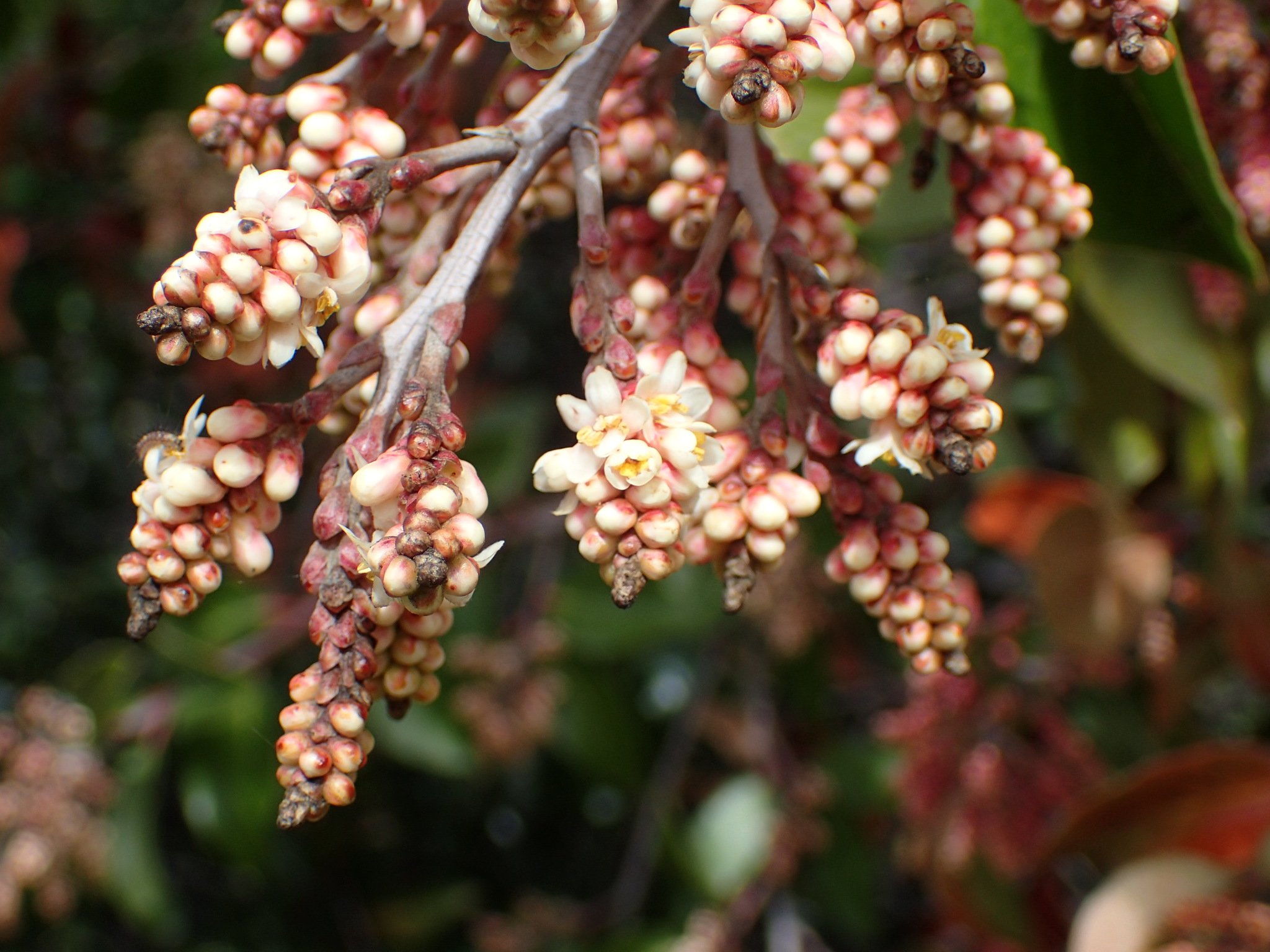
Another example of flower buds

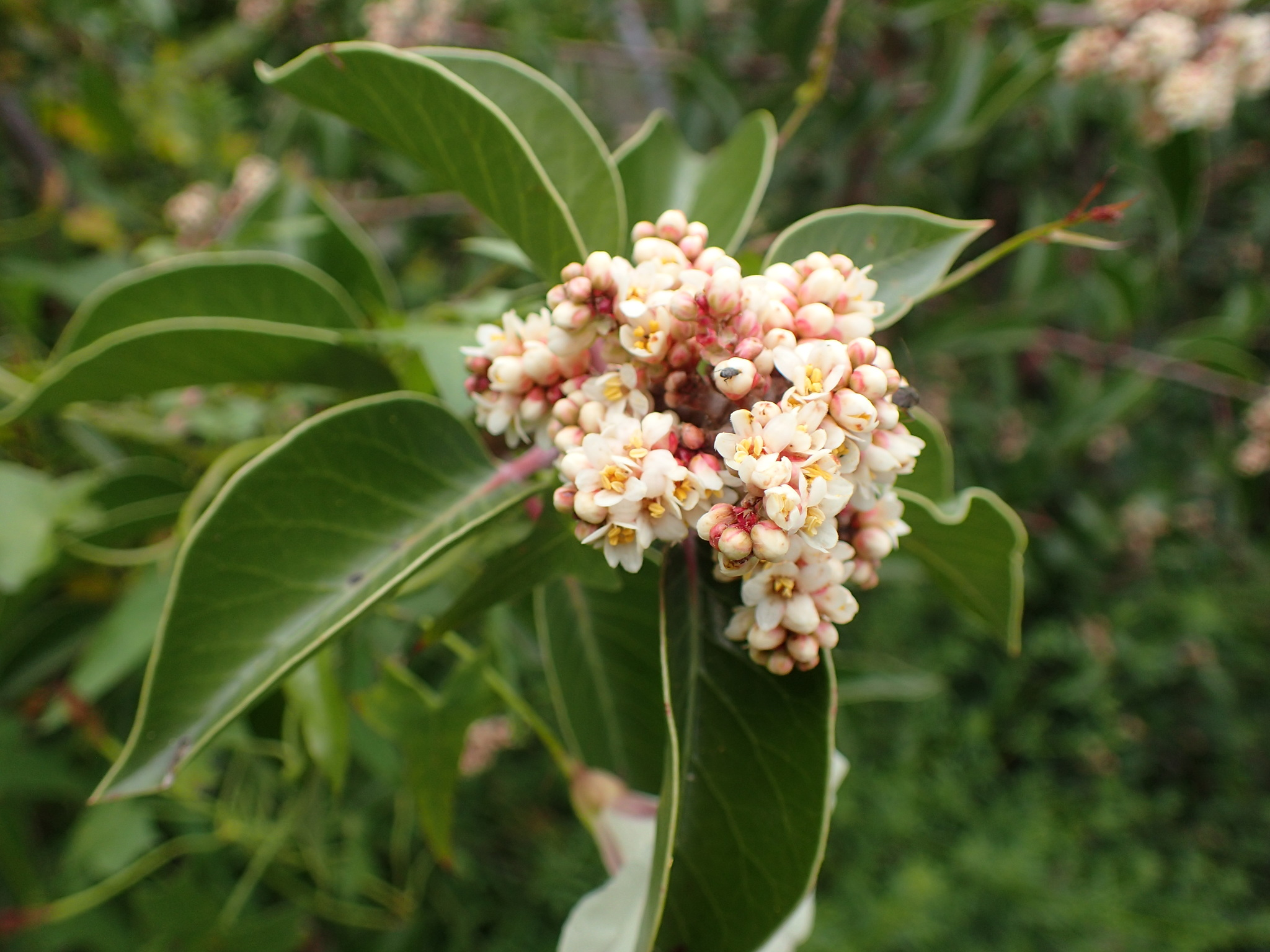
Flowering

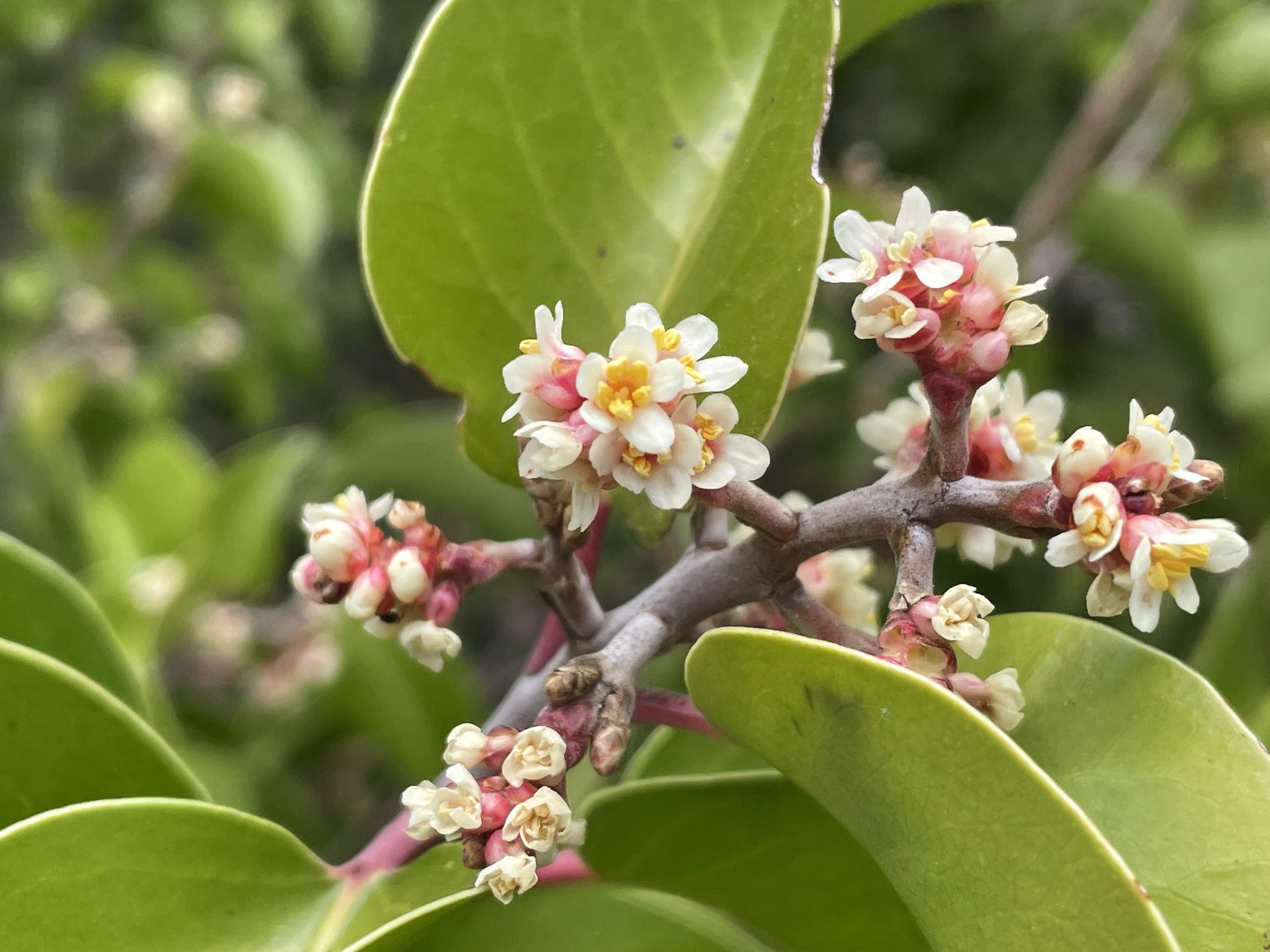
Flowering, note the clustered flowers

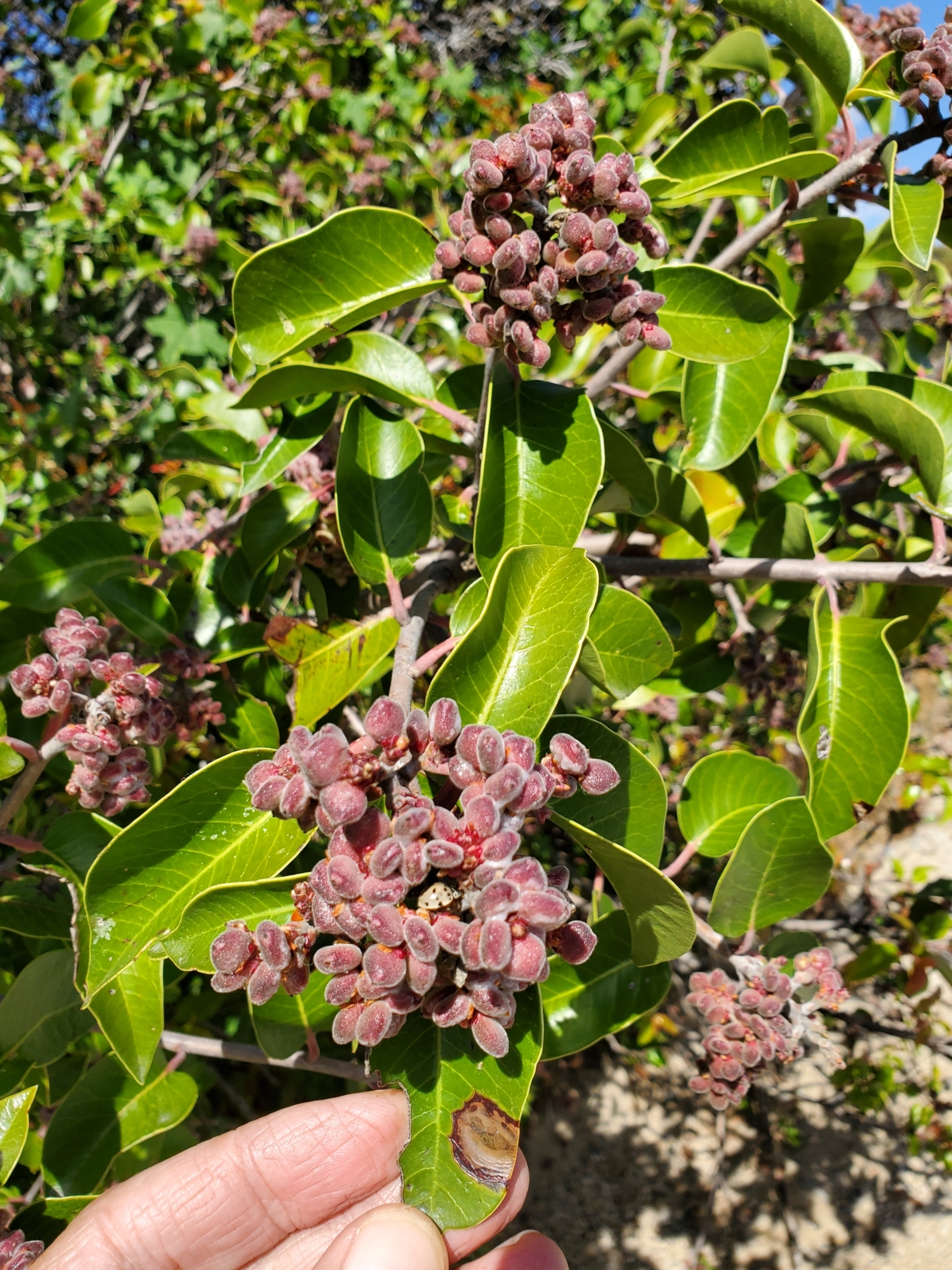
Emerging fruits

The flowers are small, less than 1 cm wide, composed of 5 white to pink petals and 5 reddish sepals with ciliate margins. They are gynodioecious and self-incompatible. Some plants may only have female flowers, others may be hermaphroditic with bisexual flowers, and some with a combination of both male-sterile female flowers and bisexual flowers. The flowers occur clustered on branched inflorescences at the end of current seasonal branches. The branches of the inflorescence are stout, with the bractlets being less than 2 mm large. The fruit is a reddish, hairy and sticky drupe, 3–5 mm long and 6–8 mm in diameter, with a flattened appearance, producing a single seed surrounded by a stony endocarp. Male-sterile plants tend to set the most fruits.

== Taxonomy ==
=== Phylogeny and hybridization ===
Over 20 species in the genus Rhus occur in North America, Europe, and Asia. Phylogenetic analysis based on numerous traits placed Rhus ovata in the section Styphonia, alongside Rhus integrifolia, the lemonade sumac. Both plants are their closest relatives, and hybridize where their range overlaps, this overlap typically being in coastal mountains. Lemonade sumac tends to occur with a more western distribution along the coast and on islands, while sugar bush is typically found more inland and to the east, with both intergrading where they meet.

The two species diverged roughly 3 million years ago, and had several period of expanding and contracting distributions, with fossils being found as far north as Nevada. Species distribution modeling implies a future northward shift for the populations in Arizona, but ecosystems in California will likely remain stable into the future. However, human impact will likely continue to fracture suitable habitats as climate change affects human development, with some implications for gene flow and adaptation. A worst-case scenario of global climate change may even see R. ovata being pushed towards the coast by 2070.

The hybrids produced are a result due to the fact that both species are visited by the same pollinators. Hybrids possess morphological traits intermediate between both species. Research has shown that only 19% of interspecific crosses produced seeds, a much lower fertility rate compared to the 61% and 73% exhibited by crosses within species. The low fertility rate of hybrids indicates that they have a loss of fitness from their parents, suggesting that there is some incompatibility between the two species. Although hybrids may be sterile, populations of sugar bush have high levels of genetic diversity.

=== Etymology ===
The epithet ovata refers to the egg-shaped leaves present on the plant.

== Distribution and habitat ==
The sugar bush is primarily located in inland localities, as it grades into its relative, the lemonade sumac, near the coast. However, it does occur on Santa Cruz and Catalina Island. It may be found throughout the inland mountains and foothills of Southern California, continuing southward through the Peninsular Ranges of San Diego County into northern Baja California, in the foothills and mountains of the Sierra de Juarez and the Sierra de San Pedro Martir. Further south, more disjunct distributions are found in the sky islands of the Central Desert of Baja California, primarily in the mountains of the Sierra La Asamblea and the Sierra San Borja. The southern limit occurs in Baja California Sur, on the Tres Virgenes volcano. The species is also found distantly in Arizona, on the Mogollon Rim.

The plant may be found along the slopes of canyons in the foothills of mountains, mostly in the chaparral and associated ecosystems. They are drought-tolerant plants, and even occur along the edges of the Colorado Desert in the eastern foothills of the Peninsular Ranges. Their preferred soil types include well-drained mediums derived from both granitic and sedimentary materials, but not alkaline soils.

== Ecology ==
The flowers bloom from March to May, and a variety of bee species may be seen visiting the flowers, including the Western honey bee and the black-tailed bumblebee, along with smaller bee genera such as Andrena, Perdita, Nomada, Evylaeus. After pollination, fruits mature over the summer and may be collected from July to August. They generally will fall onto the ground, forming a seed bank in the soil, but many will also remain on the plant into fall. Seeds may be consumed by the larvae of eurytomid wasps.

Ecology

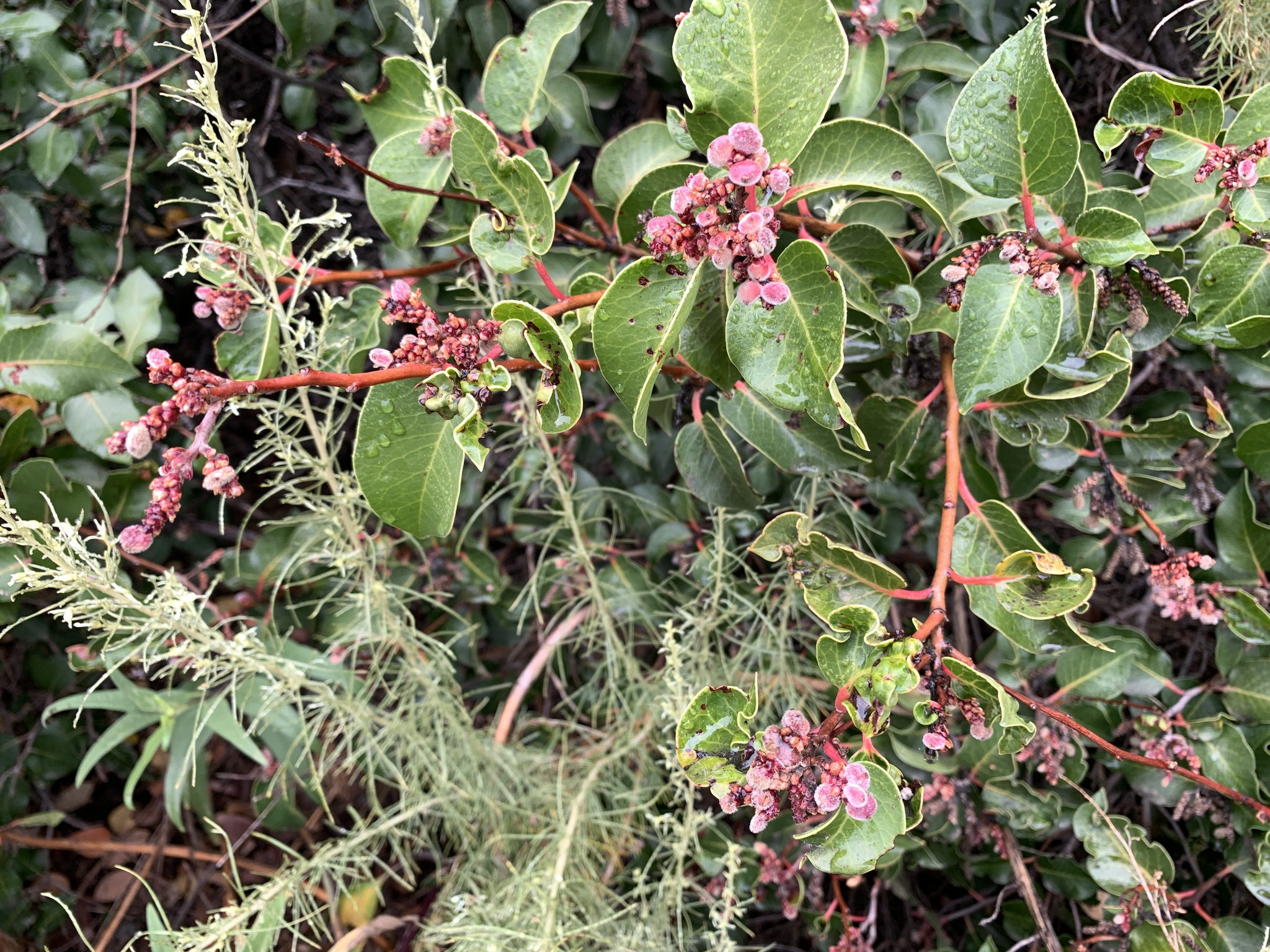
Growing with Artemisia californica

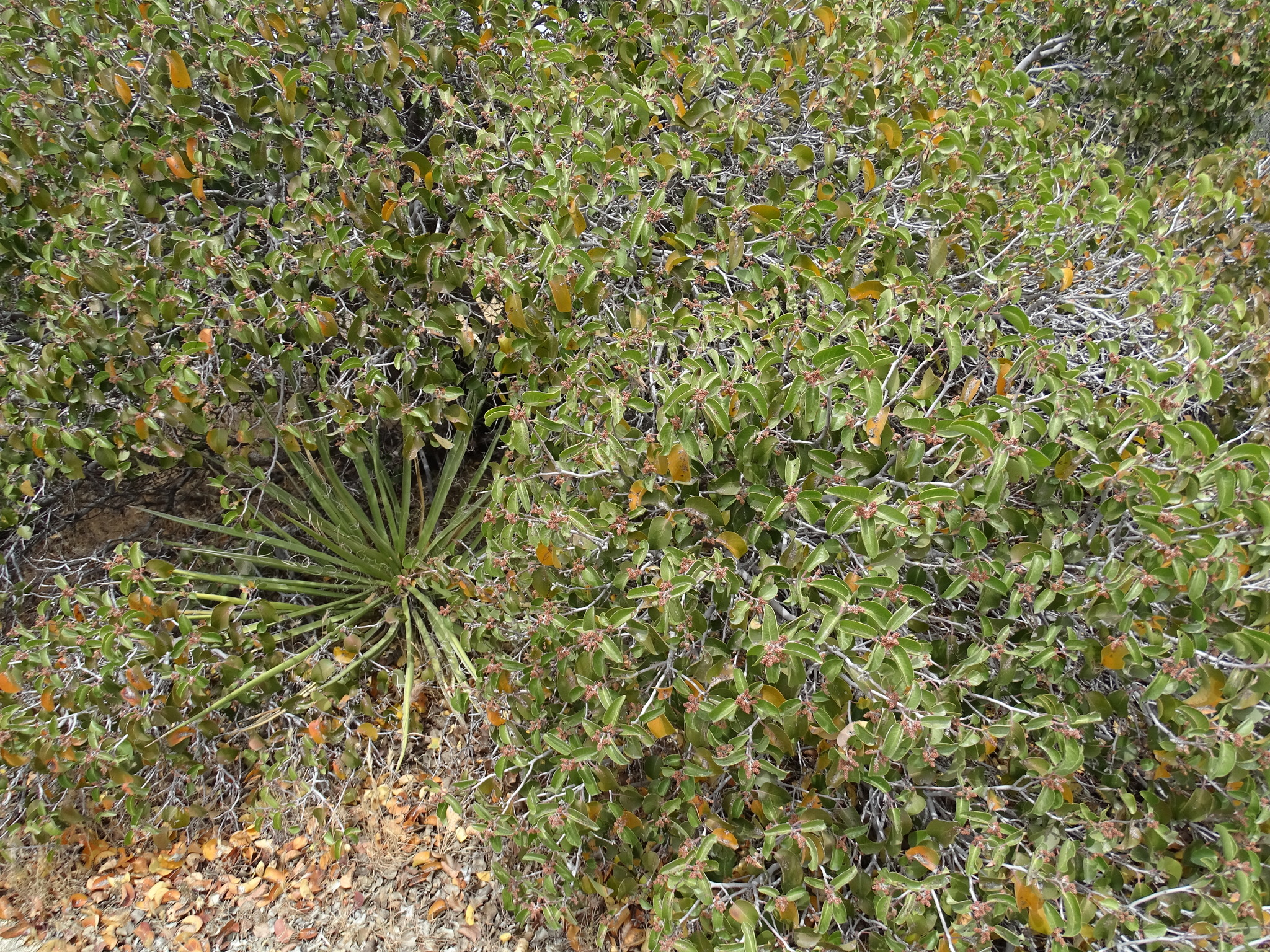
Growing with Yucca schidigera

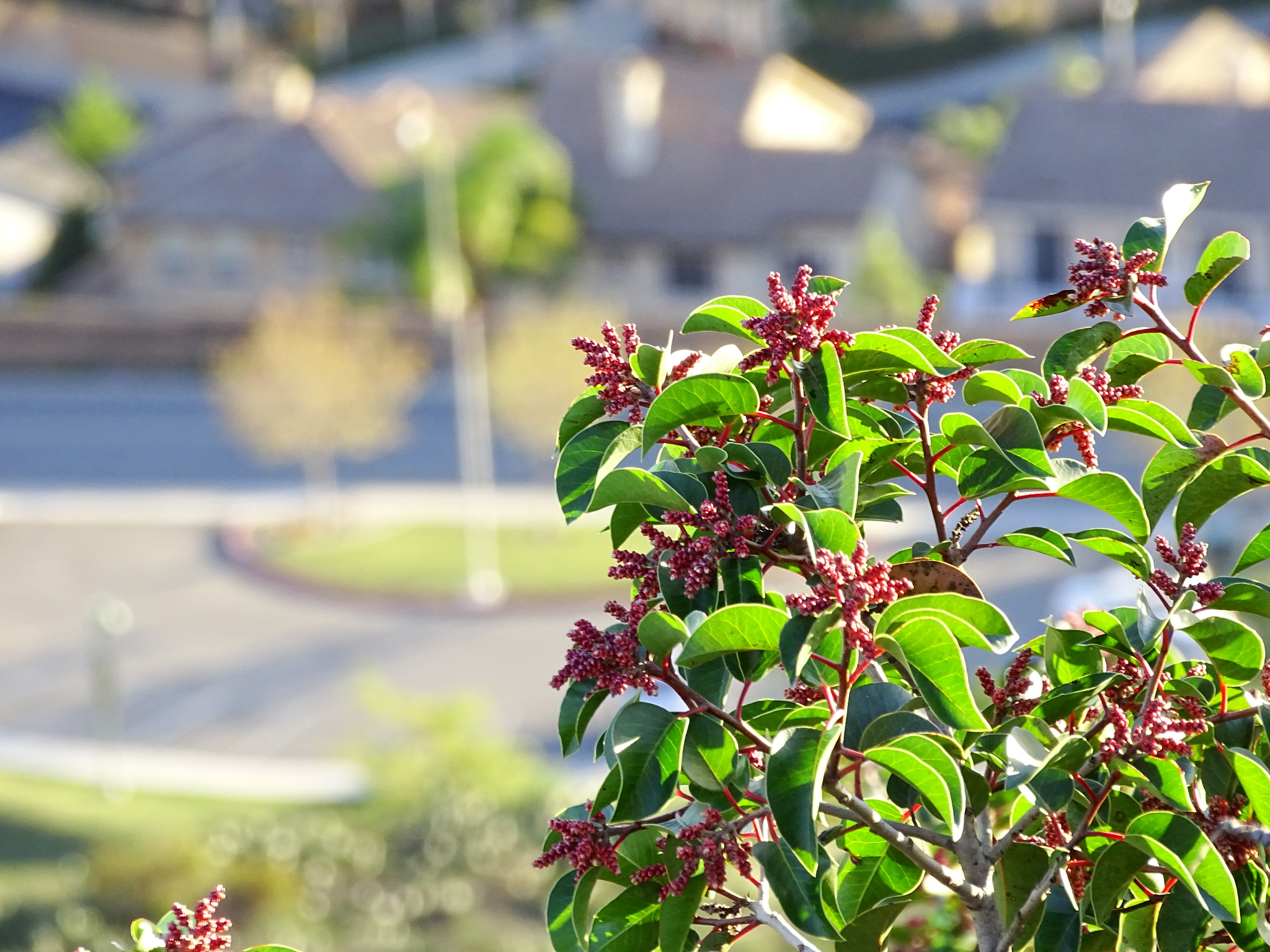
Above a suburban environment

The fruits and the seeds of Rhus species are generally dispersed by birds and mammals, and in the related Rhus integrifolia, many animals even dispersed fruits before they fell off the shrub. The larvae of the eurytomid wasps may predate up to 50% of the fallen seeds in the wild, with a singular larvae consuming the seed by entering, eating the entire interior, leaving an exit hole upon departure, which may be noticeable. Other interactors with the fruits include rodents and birds, who will also eat or disperse the seeds. Some rodents, like the dusky-footed woodrat, will strip and consume the bark of the plant, leaving entire branches bare. Pieces of the sugarbush form a minor portion of the food supply within wood-rat nests.

== Uses ==
=== Ethnobotany ===
Rhus ovata was used by the Cahuilla to treat colds and coughs, by making a tea with the leaves. It was also used as food, by eating the fresh fruits raw, dried, or ground into mush. The Cahuilla were also reported to boiled flower cluster and consume them. There are unconfirmed reports that Rhus ovata contains urushiol, the chemical irritant in plants such as poison ivy. Rhus plants have been confirmed to contain flavones, cardanols, bichalcones, chemicals which may have antimicrobial properties, and high concentrations of R. ovata extract have been proven to have antibacterial properties that impede the growth of gram-positive bacteria like Staphylococcus, but not gram-negative bacteria like E. coli or fungi.

The Kumeyaay have diverse uses for the plant, including for food, medicine, and as firewood or construction material. They eat the fruits, preparing them in a number of ways. They may be cooked or toasted when ripe, and ground into a meal like pinole. Alternatively, fruits would be made into a tangy drink, using the sugar that forms on the skin, creating a concoction with a sweet and sour taste, similar to lemonade. Medicinal uses of the plant are primarily for treatment of conditions that affect the female reproductive system. The leaves and stems, once cut, are made into a tea, which works as an anesthetic for women going through labor. The same treatment may also be applied to animals going through colic or birth, except with the infusion being made from the leaves.

The seeds are reportedly not edible.

=== Cultivation ===
Rhus ovata prefers well-drained soil in a sunny location, with little water once established, being a very drought-tolerant plant. It does not respond to formal boxed pruning well; however, as needed for wildfire fuel reduction or rejuvenation, occasional autumnal cutting, down to above the base crown, is done for new basal sprouting. The plant is good at controlling erosion.

==== Seed ====
Extracting seed from the fruit involves cleaning the flesh off by placing fruits in a macerator, blender, or by soaking the fruits until the walls are soft enough to be removed. Because the fruits have a hard endocarp, seeds must be scarified to germinate, as they are adapted to natural scarification from wildfire. Scarification can be achieved through heat treatment by boiling water or in the oven at a temperature of 100 °C for 5 minutes, or by soaking the seeds in sulfuric acid for 3 to 5 minutes. Without pretreatment, less than 5% of fresh seeds will germinate. The related lemonade sumac's seeds will germinate simply by sanding the edges of the drupe and hydrating the seed in water for a day.

== See also ==
- California chaparral and woodlands – (ecoregion)
- California coastal sage and chaparral – subecoregion
- Coastal sage scrub – (plant association)
- California montane chaparral and woodlands – subecoregion
