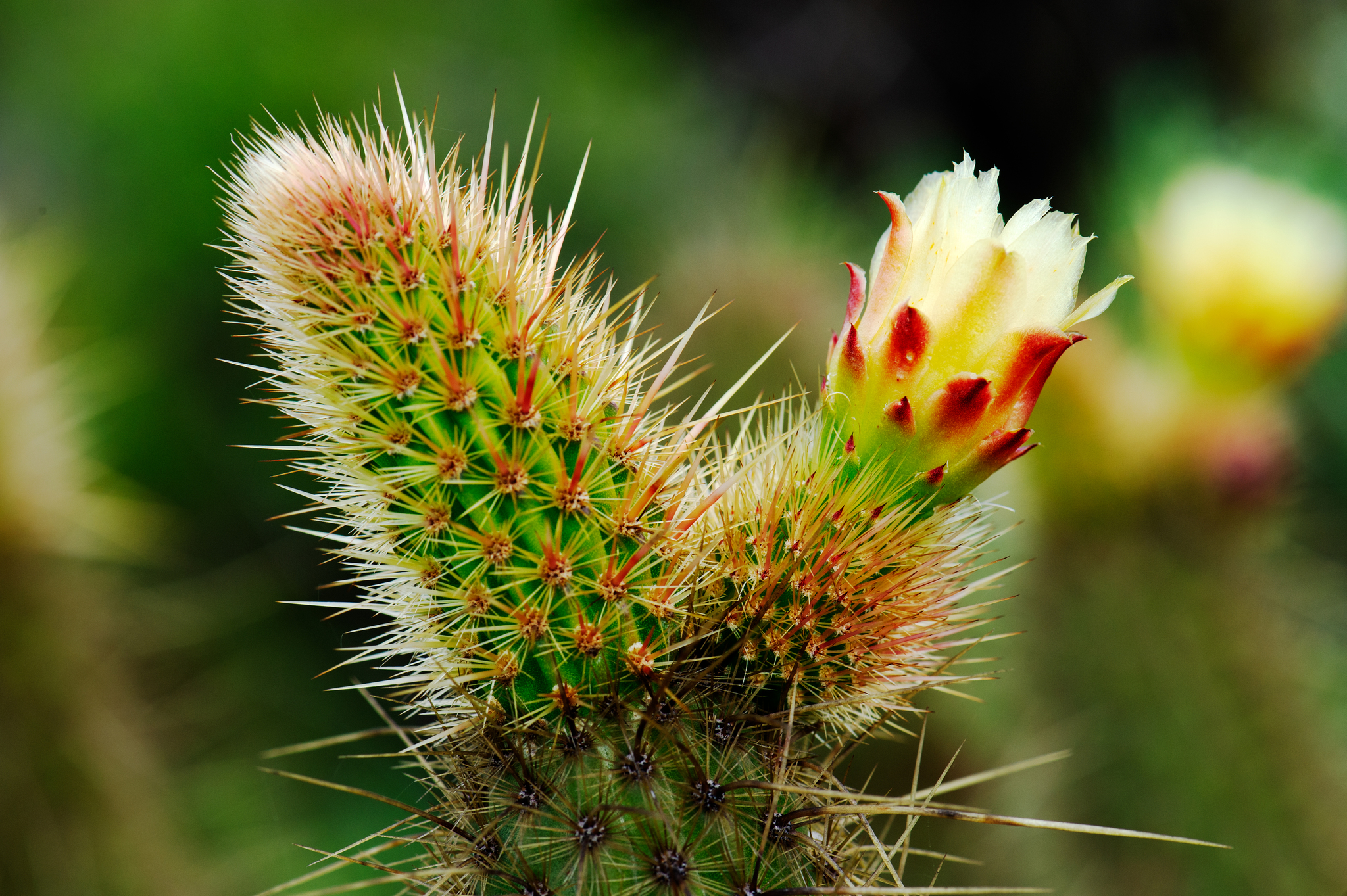

Conservation status
- Imperiled (NatureServe)

- Least Concern (IUCN 3.1)

Scientific classification
- Kingdom: Plantae
- Clade: Tracheophytes
- Clade: Angiosperms
- Clade: Eudicots
- Order: Caryophyllales
- Family: Cactaceae
- Subfamily: Cactoideae
- Tribe: Echinocereeae
- Genus: Bergerocactus; Britton & Rose
- Species: B. emoryi

Binomial name
- Bergerocactus emoryi (Engelm.) Britton & Rose

Synonyms
- Cactus emoryi (Engelm.) Lem.; Cereus emoryi Engelm.

= Bergerocactus =

Genus of cacti from North America

Bergerocactus emoryi is a species of cactus, known commonly as the golden-spined cereus, golden snake cactus, velvet cactus or golden club cactus. It is a relatively small cactus, but it can form dense thickets or colonies, with the dense yellow spines giving off a velvety appearance when backlit by the sun. From April to May, yellow, green-tinged flowers emerge, which transform into reddish, globular fruit. This species is native to the California Floristic Province, and is found in northwestern Baja California and a small part of California, in San Diego County and on the southern Channel Islands. Where the Mediterranean climate of the California Floristic Province collides with the subtropical Sonoran Desert near El Rosario, hybrids with two other species of cacti are found. It is the sole member of the monotypic genus Bergerocactus.

== Description ==
This species is a shrub-like cactus, forming thickets of columnar to prostrate stems. The colonies have a velvety appearance when backlit by the sun. The stems are usually less than 2 metres (6.6 ft) long, covered in numerous, interlaced, yellow and needle-like spines. The stems are 3–6 cm (1.2–2.4 in) in diameter, cylindrical, and with 12 to 18 ribs. There are 30 to 45 spines per areole, and most are less than 2 mm (0.079 in) in diameter. There are 1 to 3 central spines, which are curved downward, the longest less than 6 cm (2.4 in). The radial spines are straight.

The flowers emerge either laterally or at the apex of the stem, at the distal margin of the spine cluster. The flower is 3.5–5 cm (1.4–2.0 in) long, and 2.5–4 cm (0.98–1.57 in) in diameter. The ovary is free of hair, and densely spiny. The outer perianth parts are yellow, with the tips more-or-less red, and the midveins green, with all of the inner perianth colored yellow. After blooming, a reddish, globular fruit emerges, covered in dense spines, and extruding seeds and pulp at the tip. The seeds are 3 mm (0.12 in) large, shiny and black.

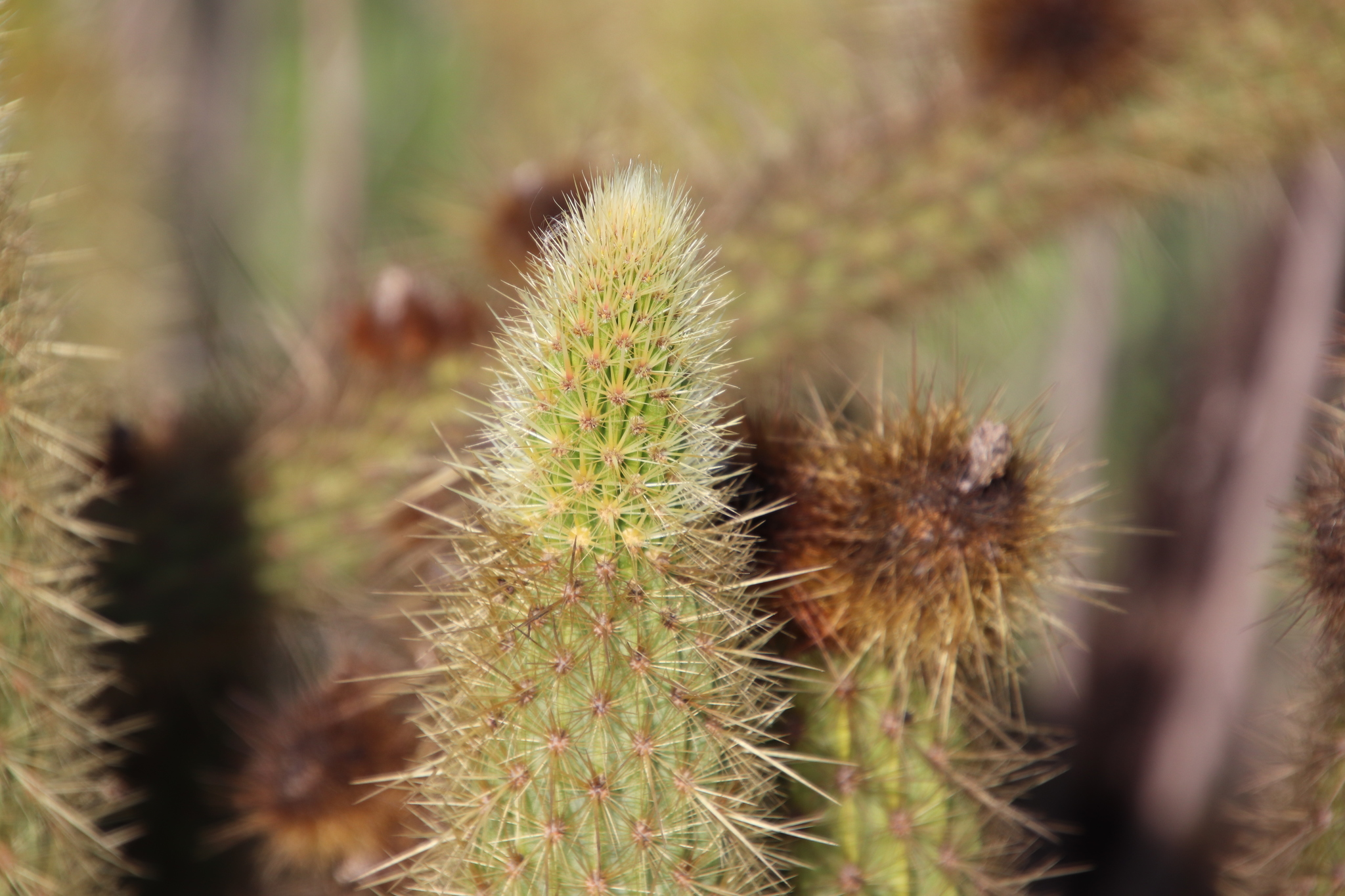
A growing stem

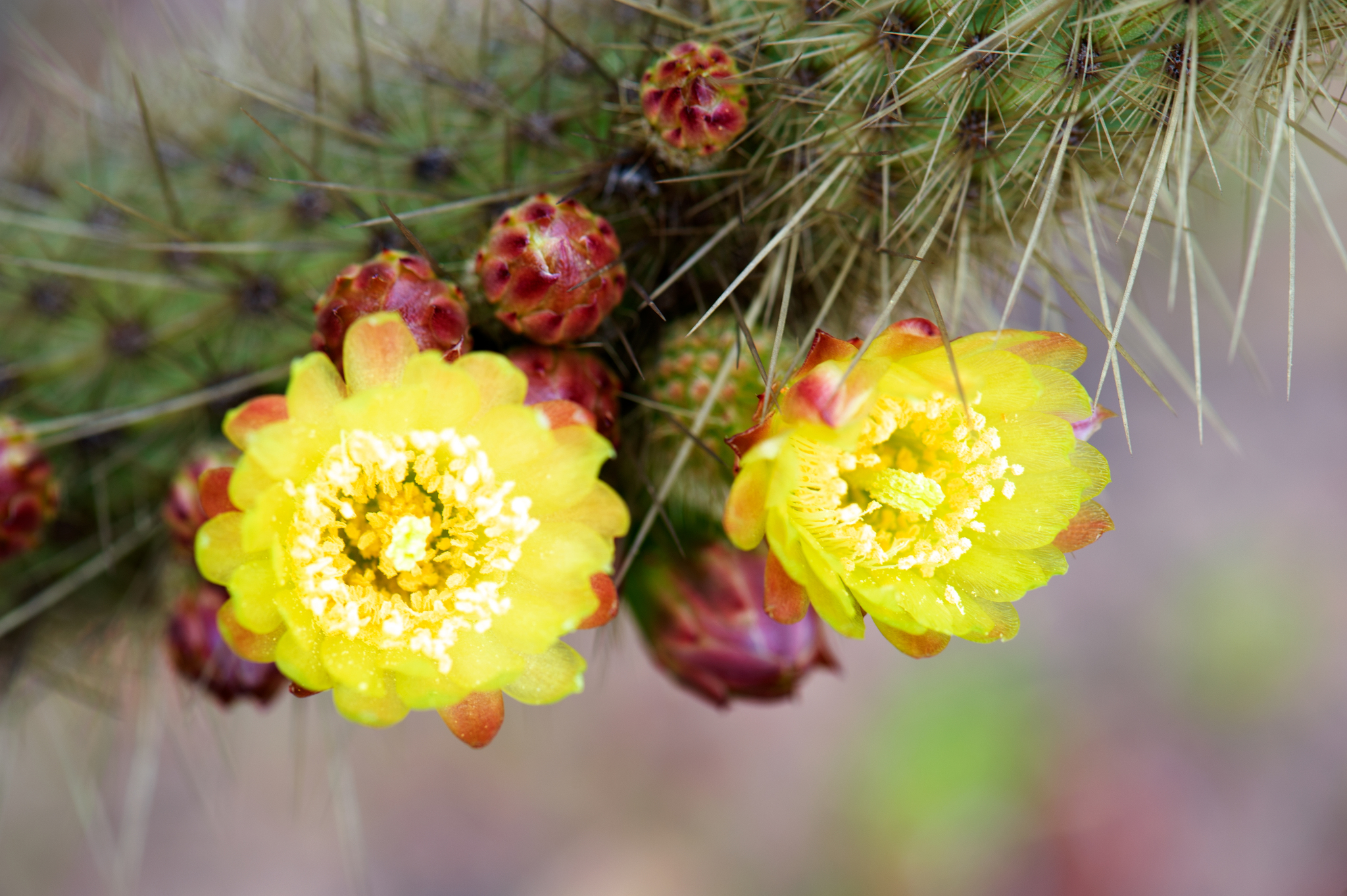
Flowers and flower buds

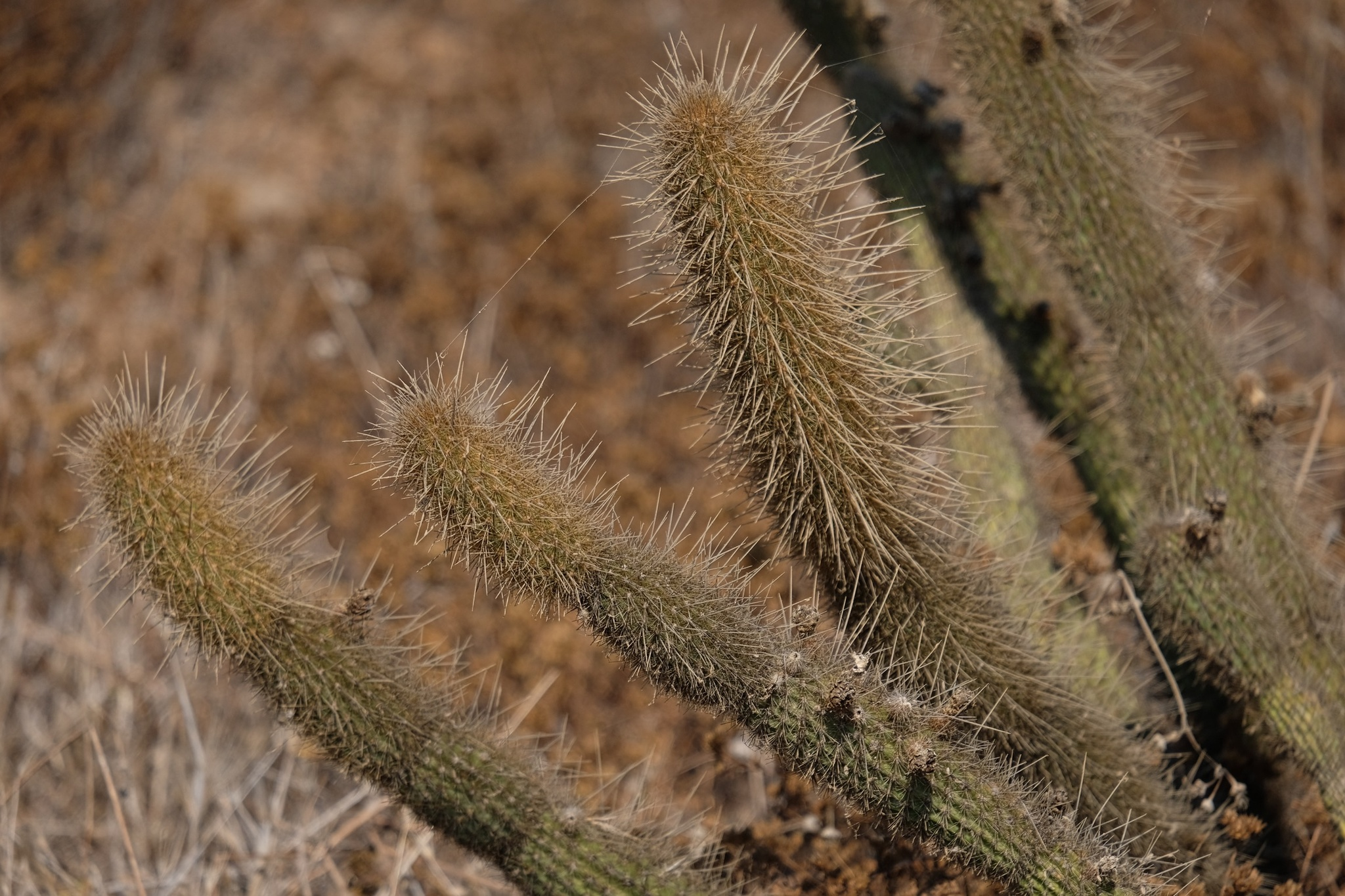
Growing in habitat

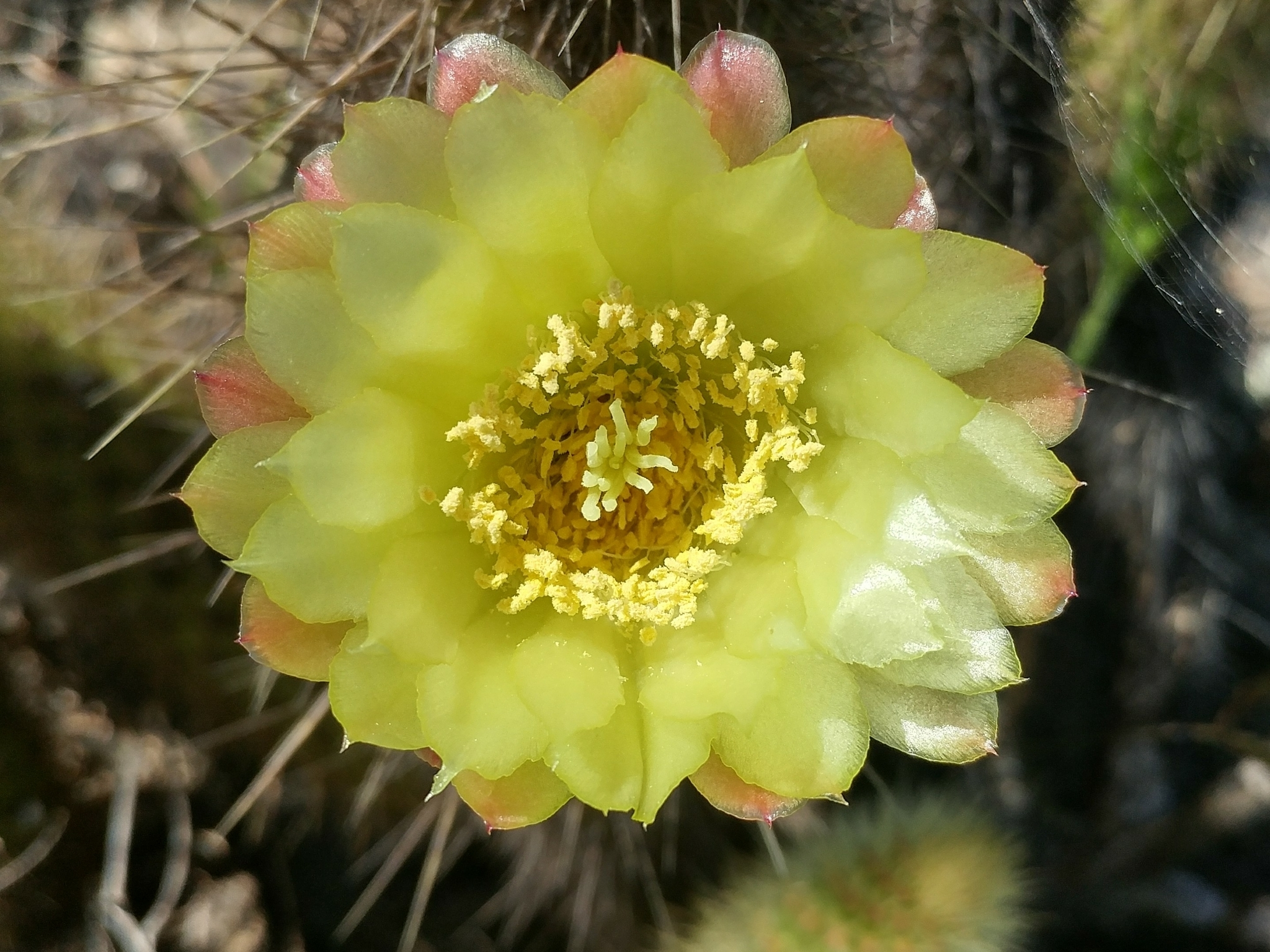
The flower

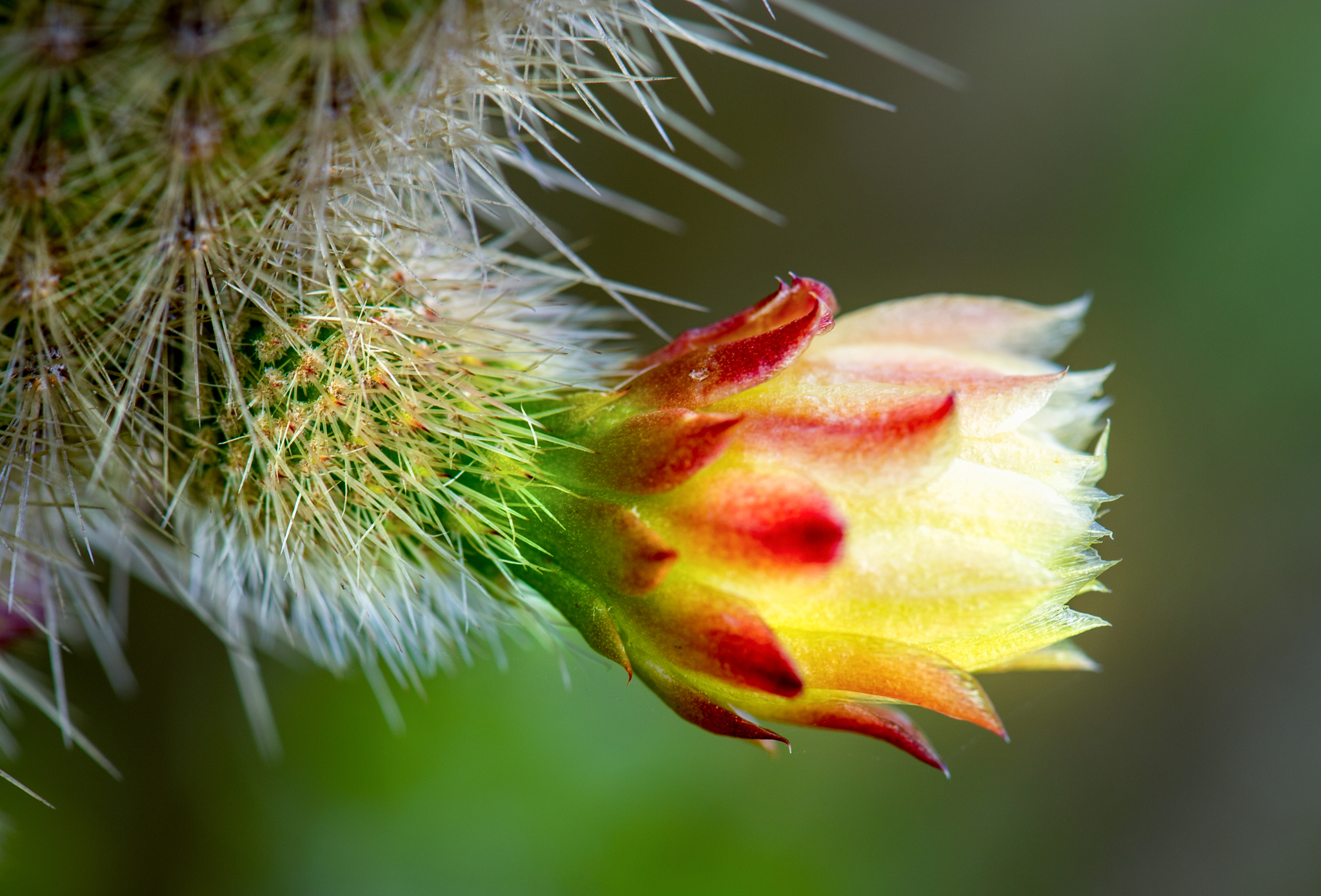
A budding flower

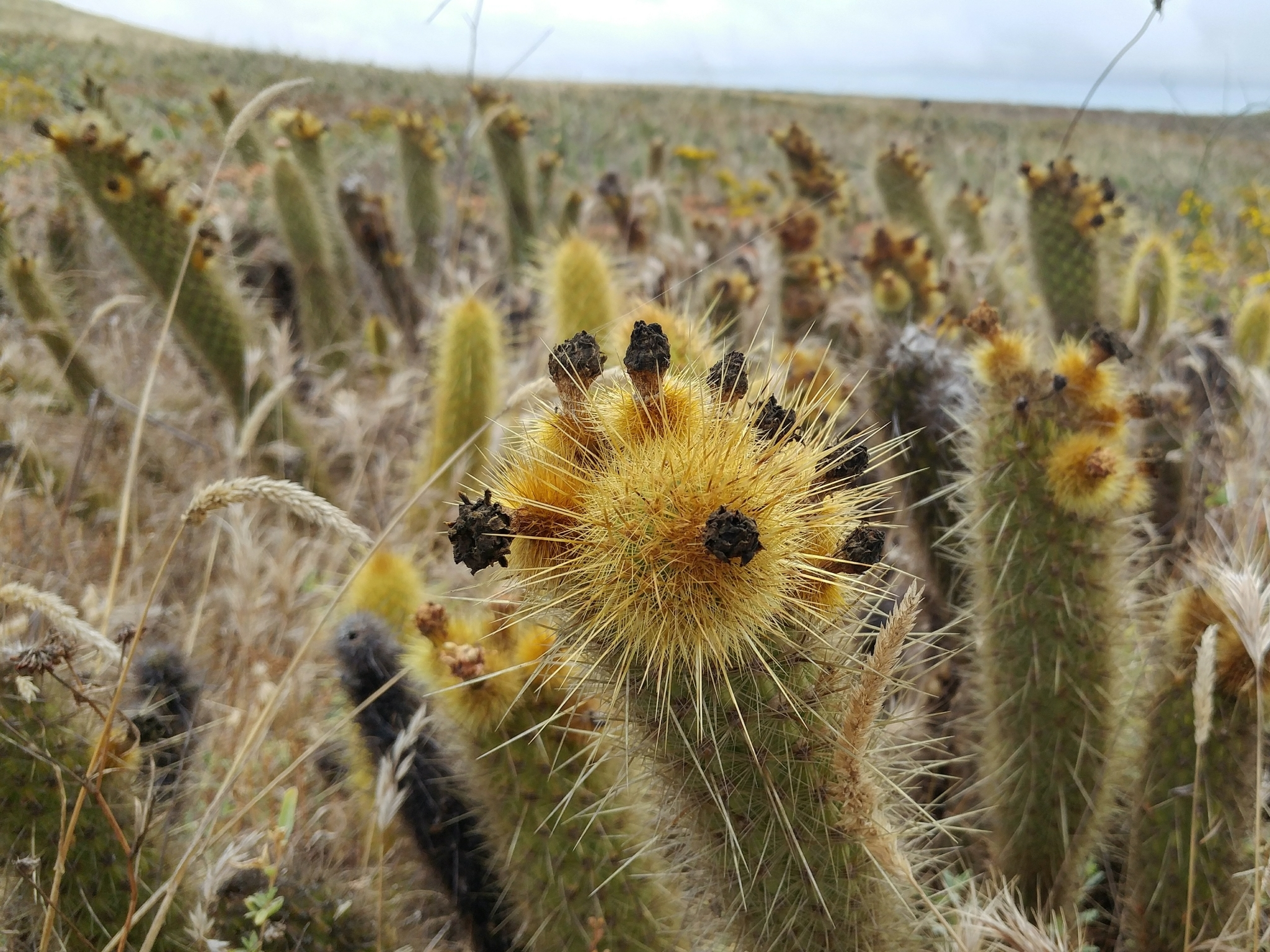
Fruit

== Taxonomy ==
The species was first collected in California by John LeConte and Charles Parry and sent to George Engelmann, who published its initial description in 1852 as Cereus emoryi. Nathaniel Lord Britton and Joseph Nelson Rose later established the genus Bergerocactus in 1909. The genus name honors Alwin Berger, a German cactus specialist, and the species epithet emoryi commemorates American Major William Hemsley Emory, who surveyed the Mexican border from 1850 to 1854. The cactus has a chromosome count of 2n=44. There is an extensive number of common names, which include the golden cereus, golden-spined cereus, golden snake cactus, velvet cactus, golden club cactus. The plant is also known as snake cactus, though this latter name also applies to Echinocereus pensilis.

=== Hybrids ===
The golden cereus is known to hybridize with other species of cacti. Both occur in the vicinity of El Rosario. Hybrids include:

==== × Myrtgerocactus lindsayi ====
Moran (Lindsay hybrid cactus)

A naturally occurring intergeneric hybrid with Myrtillocactus cochal. It is a triploid plant, which helps substantiate that it is a hybrid between the diploid M. cochal and the tetraploid B. emoryi. It has light-yellow flowers, and is known only from a few plants. Its generic name comes from those of its parents (Mytillocactus and Bergerocactus) and its specific epithet, "lindsayi", is in honor of the botanist George Lindsay. The cactus was first found by Lindsay near El Rosario, Baja California, in 1950 while on a trip to look for Pacherocactus. Specimens were cultivated at the Desert Botanical Garden, finally blooming in 1961 and formally described the following year.

==== × Pacherocactus orcuttii ====
(K. Brandegee) G.D. Rowley (Orcutt hybrid cactus)

A naturally occurring intergeneric hybrid with Pachycereus pringlei, discovered near El Rosario, Baja California. The plant's generic name is formed from those of its parents (Pachycereus and Bergerocactus). Sometimes it can be found listed as Pachycereus × Bergerocactus. It can grow to a height of about 3.5 m and a diameter of about 10 cm. The cactus does not thrive below 10 °C. Its flowers are green-brown in color and of about 4 cm in size.

== Distribution, habitat, and conservation ==
The plant is near-endemic to Baja California, with the exception of populations on Santa Catalina Island, San Clemente Island, and San Diego, California at elevations from 30 up to approximately 60 meters. The populations remaining in San Diego are disjunct, located in Border Field State Park, Torrey Pines State Park, and Cabrillo National Monument, as the urban development in San Diego has relegated many species to these protected areas.

Other rare species that inhabit these enclaves of maritime succulent scrub in San Diego include Rosa minutifolia, Aesculus parryi, Echinocereus ferreirianus, Cochemiea dioica, Cylindropuntia prolifera, Cylindropuntia cholla, Opuntia oricola, Shaw's Agave, the Torrey Pine, the Tapertip liveforever, cliff spurge, and the San Diego barrel cactus. Aside from urban development, the plant is also threatened by collecting and feral goats.

The species is represented on two of the southern California Channel Islands. On San Clemente Island, the golden cactus is found inhabiting rocky canyon walls.

In Baja California, the species continues from the border south into the succulent scrub to El Rosario. It occurs on numerous islands off the coast; however, climate change and other anthropogenic influences are threatening the insular populations. On Isla San Martin, a volcanic island off of the San Quintin Bay, only a single clump of the cactus is left.

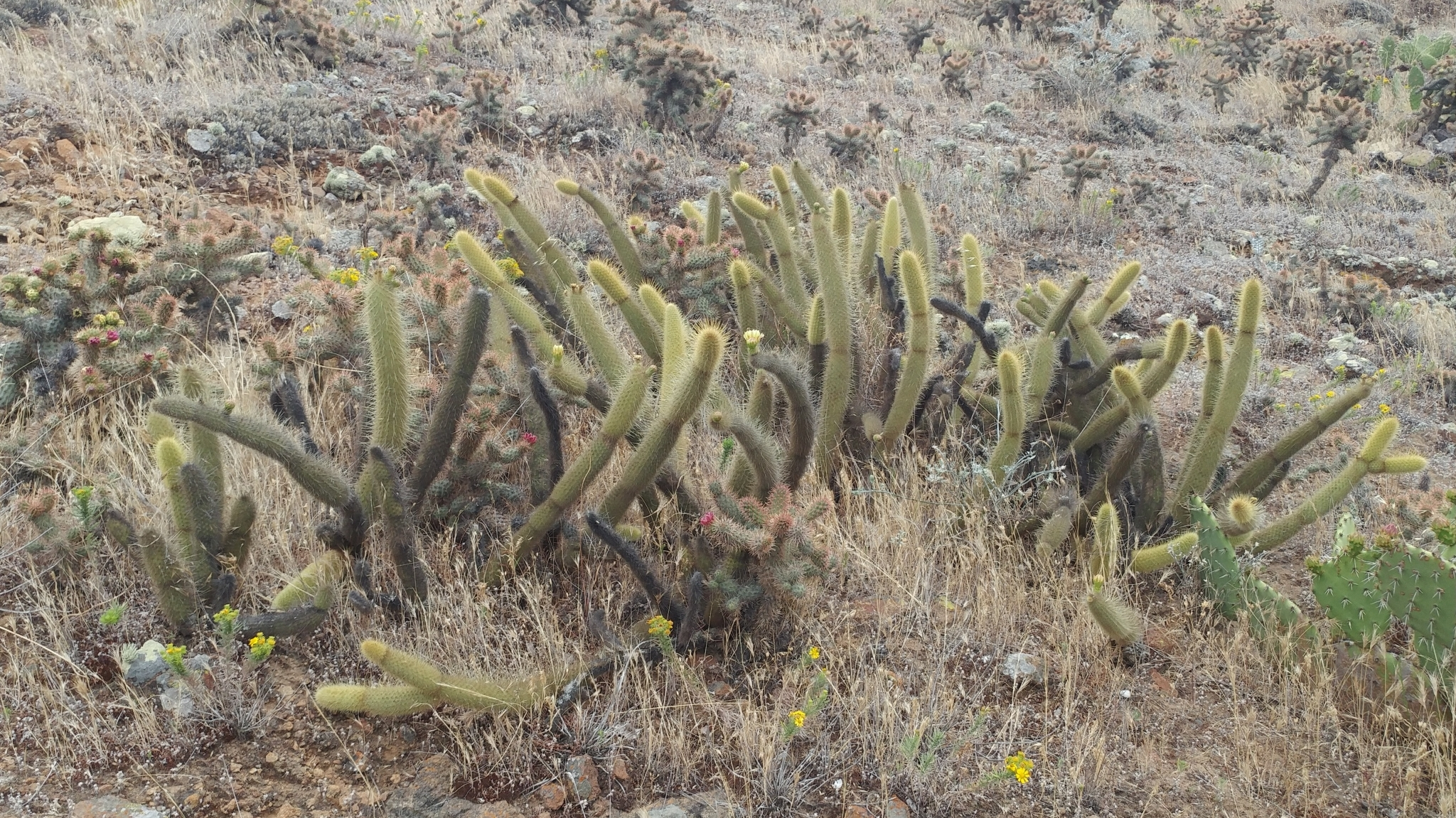
Habitat in San Diego, California

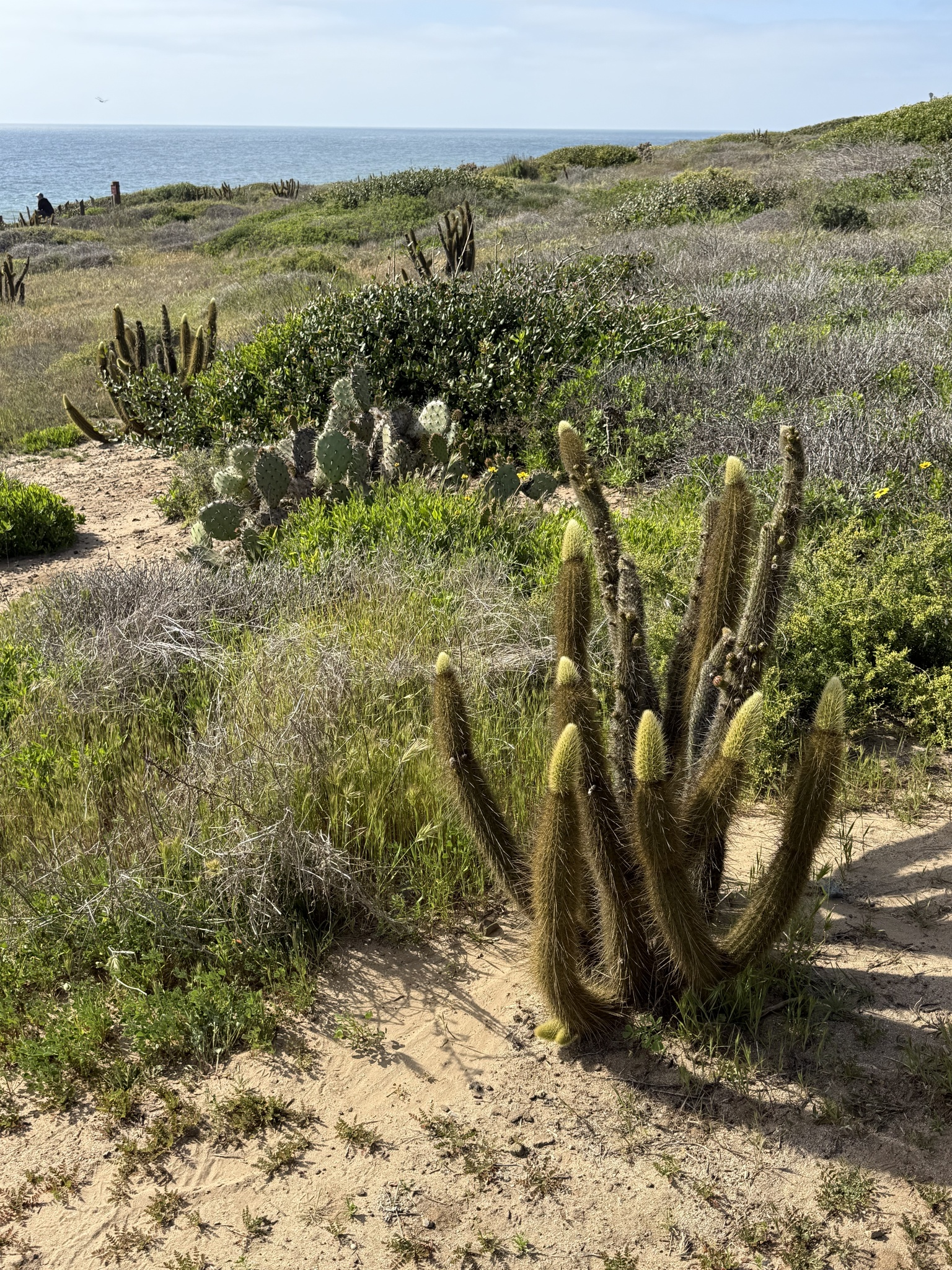
Plants growing in maritime scrub in San Diego, California

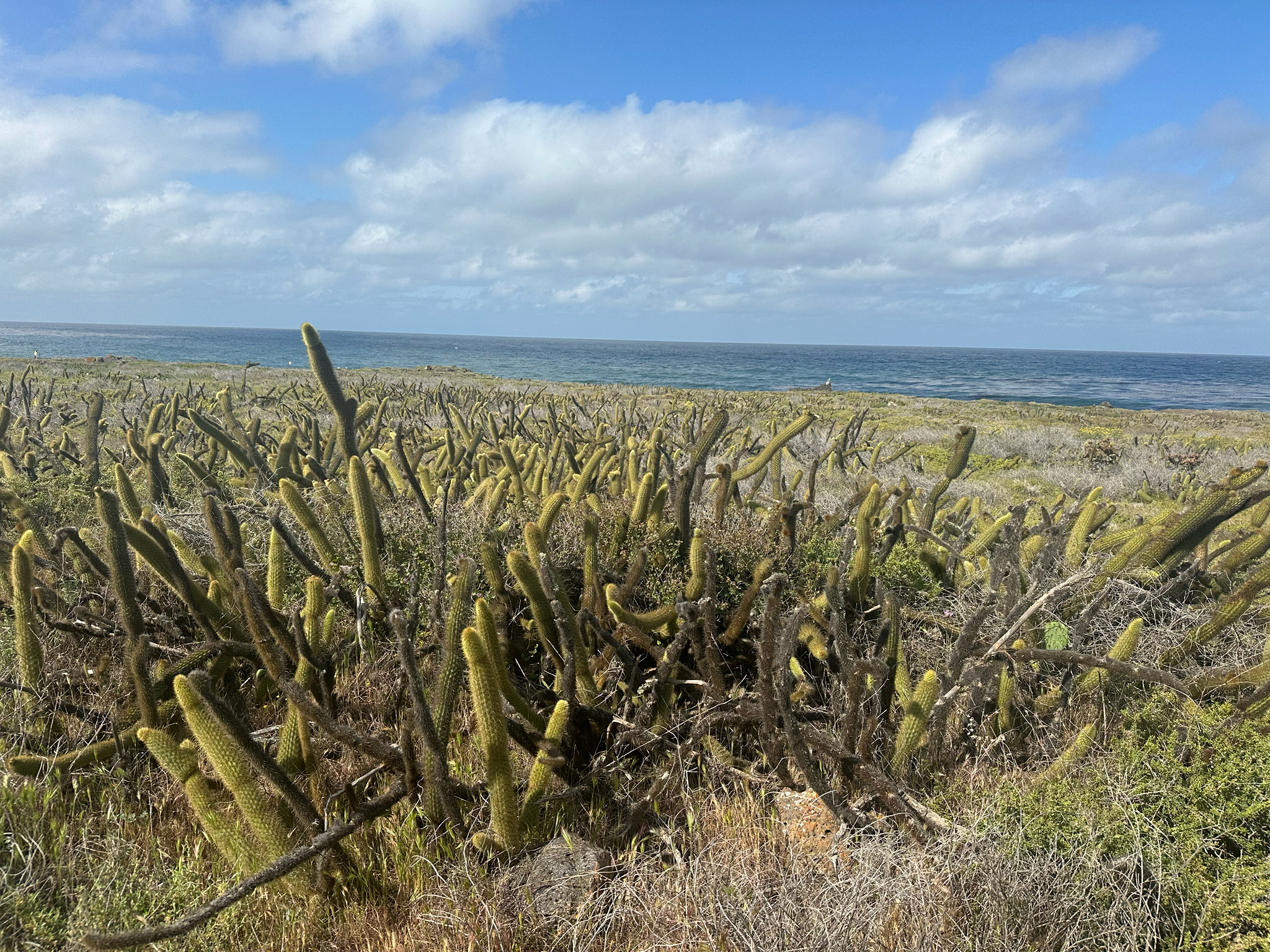
Plants growing on San Clemente Island
