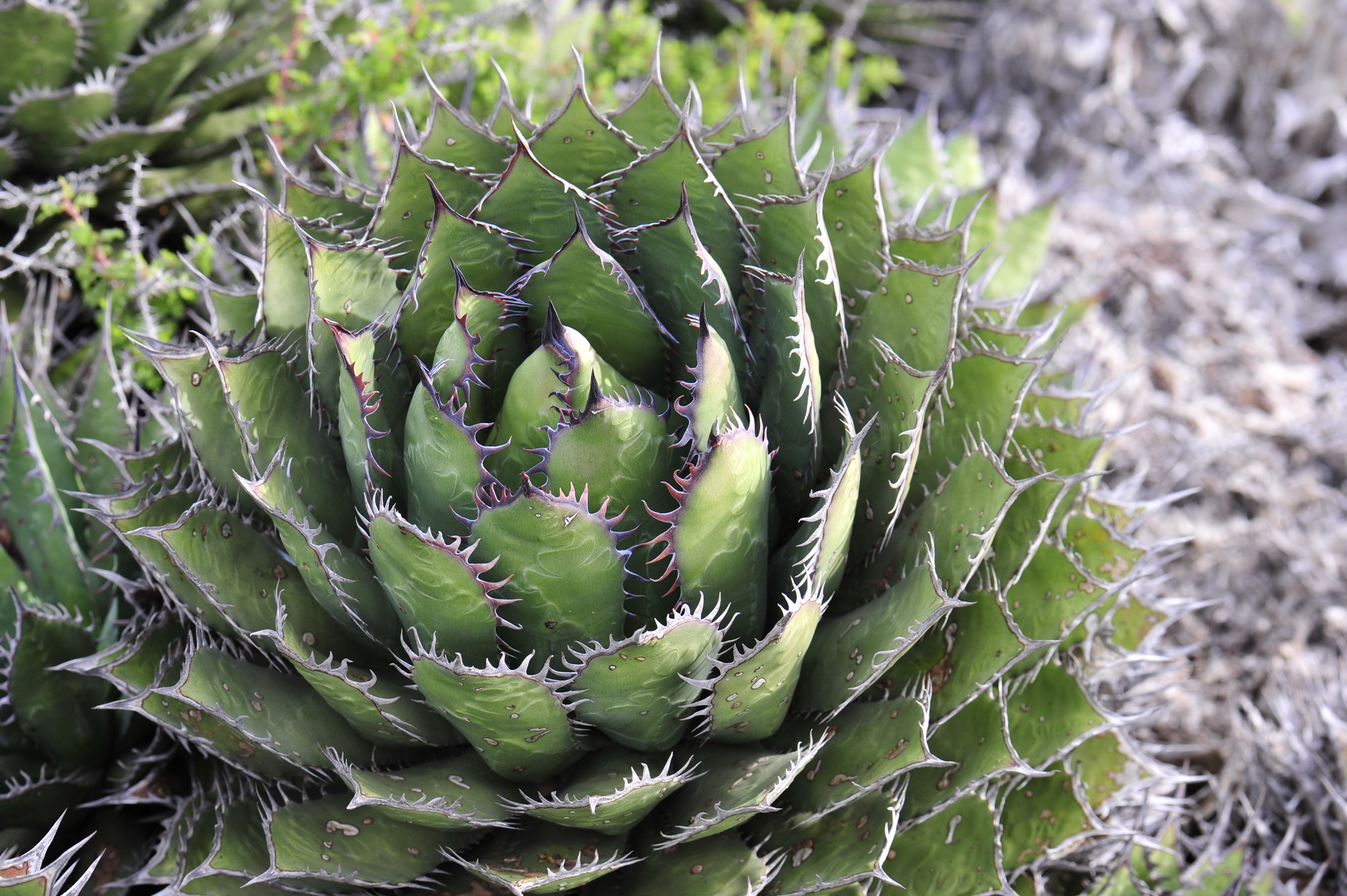
- Rosette of Agave shawii subsp. shawii

Conservation status
- Least Concern (IUCN 3.1)

- Imperiled (NatureServe)

Scientific classification
- Kingdom: Plantae
- Clade: Tracheophytes
- Clade: Angiosperms
- Clade: Monocots
- Order: Asparagales
- Family: Asparagaceae
- Subfamily: Agavoideae
- Genus: Agave
- Species: A. shawii

Binomial name
- Agave shawii Engelm.

Synonyms
- Agave orcuttiana Trel.; Agave pachyacantha Trel.

= Agave shawii =

Species of succulent plant from North America

Agave shawii is a species of monocarpic succulent plant in the genus Agave, commonly known as Shaw's agave. It is a rosette-forming plant characterized by glossy, green leaves with toothed margins. After several years of slow growth, the plant puts all of its resources to produce a towering stalk of flowers, and then dies. The death of the flowering rosette is compensated by the growth of numerous clonal pups. This species is segregated into two subspecies, one native to the coast of southwestern California and northwestern Baja California, known commonly as the coast agave, and another native to the Baja California desert, known as the Goldman agave.

For centuries, this species proved to be an invaluable source of accessible and abundant food for the indigenous peoples in the region, like the Kumeyaay, Tiipai and Paipai. After the European colonization of the Americas, the Spanish missionaries discouraged use of the agave, and moved the native peoples inland. Further development of the agave's habitat by American settlers contributed to the dwindling population of the species. Only two small populations are left within the political boundaries of the United States, one with only a single individual. In Mexico, it is still abundant but threatened by coastal development. Subspecies shawii is designated as an endangered species by the California Native Plant Society and the IUCN. The plant is named for Henry Shaw, the founder of the Missouri Botanical Garden.

== Description ==
Agave shawii is a very slow-growing, small-to-medium-sized agave.

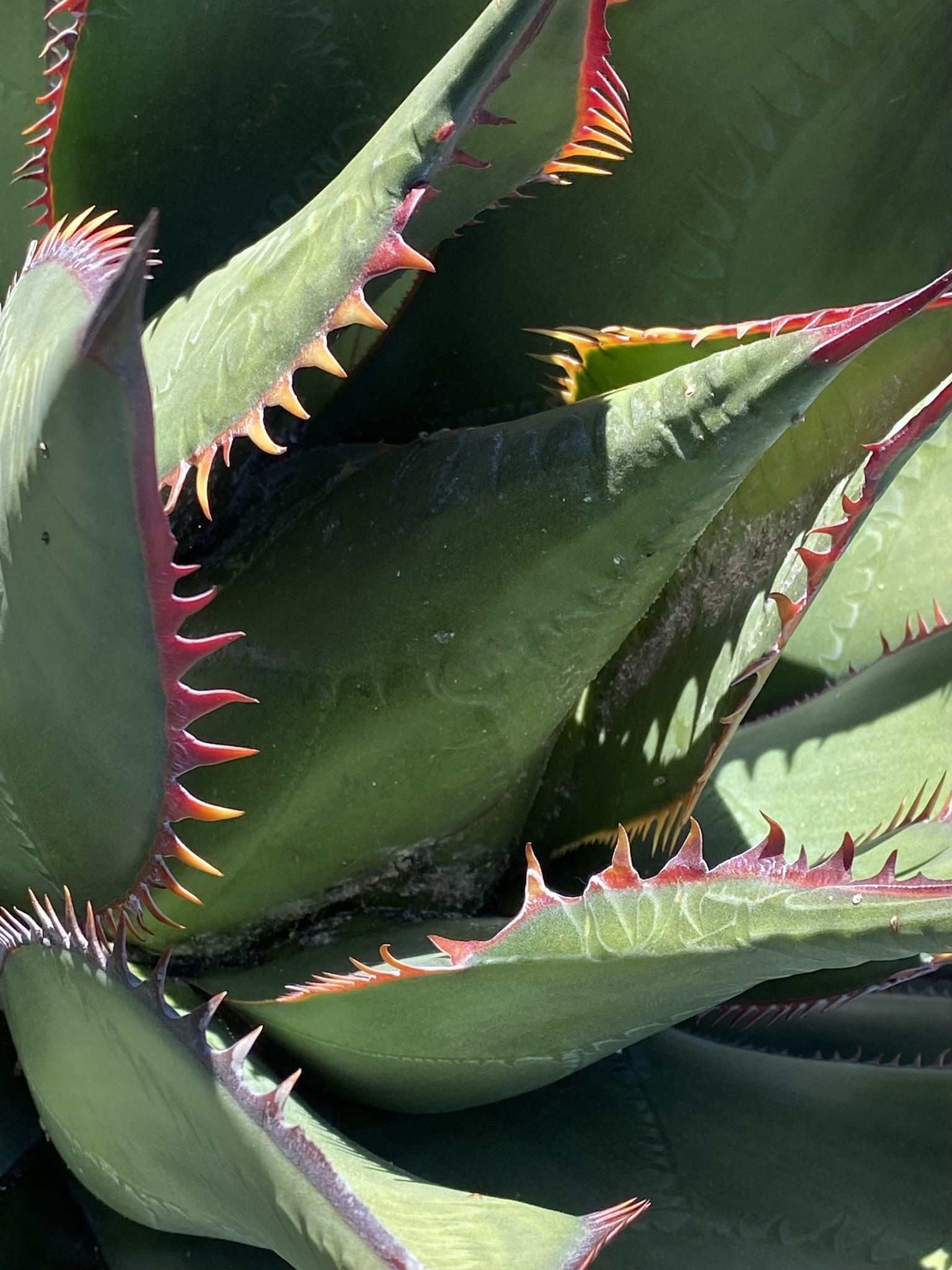
The colorful spines on the margins of the leaves

The foliage is arranged in a rosette that measures 8 centimetres (3.1 in) to 2 metres (6.6 ft) wide. There may be numerous rosettes on top of erect to decumbent trunks that emerge from the rootstock. The foliage is glossy, colored light to dark green, and positioned in an ascending fashion. The leaves are shaped narrow to ovate, measuring 20–50 cm (7.9–19.7 in) long by 8–20 cm (3.1–7.9 in) wide, with the abaxial (lower surface) surface convex. Leaves feel thick, fleshy, and rigid, and their margins are armed with colorful and well-defined spines. The spine at the tip of the leaf measures 2–4 cm (0.79–1.57 in).

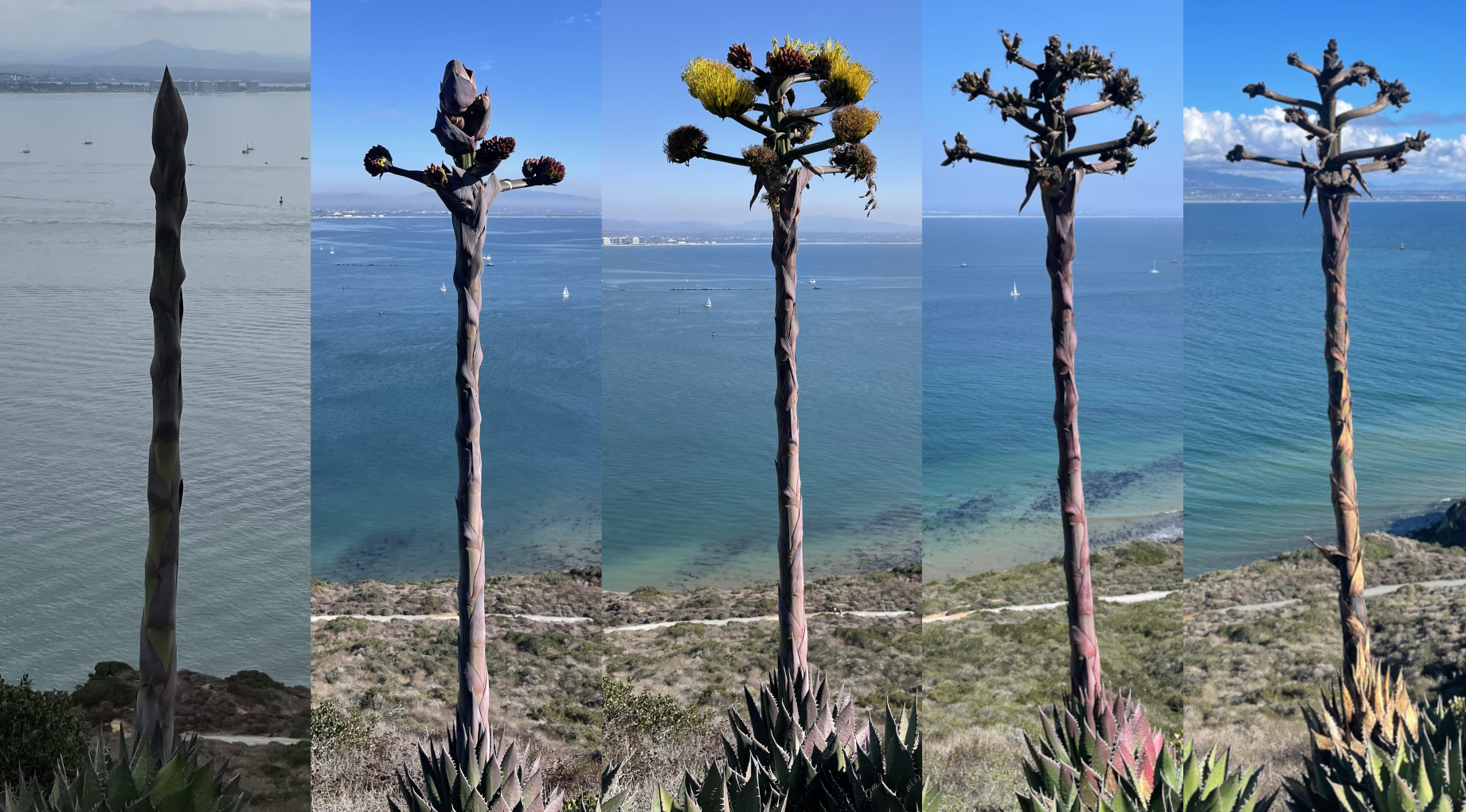
Various stages of Shaw's Agave flowering

The panicle-like inflorescence grows 2–4 m (6.6–13.1 ft) tall. The bracts (leaves on the inflorescence) are persistent, shaped lanceolate to triangular, and are 10–25 cm (3.9–9.8 in) large. Subtended by the bracts are 8–14 lateral umbels (branches), which are 10–20 cm (3.9–7.9 in) long. Each umbel consists of a mass of yellowish or reddish flowers, with 35–75 flowers per cluster. After flowering, it produces fruits 5.5–7 cm (2.2–2.8 in) large, containing fertilized (black-colored) and unfertilized (white-colored) seeds.

It generally flowers September to May, and as typical for agaves, the rosette dies thereafter. Although capable of reproducing by suckering, populations vary considerably in their behavior, with some consisting entirely of individual rosettes, while others form groups or colonies of clones.

=== Subdivisions ===
The infraspecific taxa are variously labeled as varieties or subspecies, depending on the source.

- Agave shawii subsp. shawii — The autonymous subspecies. The southernmost "typical" plants that can easily be distinguished occur near San Quintin. Near El Rosario, both subspecies become difficult to discern.
- Agave shawii subsp. goldmaniana (Trel.) Gentry — Commonly known as the Goldman agave. The rosette leaves are 40–70 cm (16–28 in) long, and 10–18 cm (3.9–7.1 in) wide, shaped lanceolate. The inflorescence has 18–25 umbels on a 3–5 meter stem. The long and broader shape of the inflorescence, along with the narrow leaves set it apart from the typical subspecies. It predominates in the coast and desert of the southern part of Baja California state. This subspecies has much higher rates of seed set and seedling recruitment compared to subsp. shawii.

Agave sebastiana, a plant native to Cedros Island and the Vizcaino Peninsula, was formerly placed in this species as Agave shawii var. sebastiana.

== Distribution and habitat ==
This species is primarily distributed in, and near-endemic to, the state of Baja California in Mexico. It was formerly widespread along the coast of San Diego County, California, but coastal development has reduced the entire population to just two natural occurrences, of which only one is wholly natural. There is a 25 km (16 mi) north-to-south gap between the southernmost natural plants in San Diego County and the northernmost natural plants in Baja California. The coastal subspecies shawii is the taxon present in San Diego County, and ranges south to El Rosario in Baja California. At El Rosario, it is subsumed by the desert subspecies goldmaniana, which ranges south into the desert to Santa Rosaliíta in southern Baja California.

Subspecies shawii only occurs in a vegetation community known as maritime succulent scrub, which is found along the Pacific Coast of northern Baja California state of Mexico and southwesternmost San Diego County of California. This habitat only extends a few kilometers into the United States, occurring in narrow bands on coastal bluffs with almost constant exposure to coastal winds with high salt content. Maritime succulent scrub is regarded as the most xeric of the coastal sage vegetation types, and is dominated by other succulent plants such as cacti (Bergerocactus, Cylindropuntia, Ferocactus, Mammilaria, Opuntia), cliff spurge (Euphorbia misera) and Crassulacean plants like Dudleya. Subspecies shawii was probably once found north of Torrey Pines, but with the development of all viable habitat, has all but disappeared from the American side of the border.

== Uses ==
=== Cultivation ===
Agave shawii is cultivated as an ornamental plant, by specialty plant nurseries. It is used in cactus and succulent gardens, containers, and for drought tolerant and wildlife gardens.

Plants enjoy a sandy loam soil that has good drainage. It is recommended to plant in a location where the sharp spines will not be a hazard. Virtually disease free except for scale insects. Roots are very rapid responders to rain and dry plants start growing feeder (rain) roots after exposure to the rain. Plants develop best color when exposed to full sun along the coast. Some relief from the hot afternoon sun in the inland valleys with partial shade would provide the best results for growers. Within the United States, it is not recommended to grow this plant in desert locations like Las Vegas, but it will thrive in coastal locations from San Diego to San Francisco.

In a preservation effort, Shaw's agaves were introduced into Torrey Pines State Natural Reserve and Cabrillo National Monument in San Diego, California and have established themselves. There is also large colony of Shaw's agave in San Diego Botanic Garden located in Encinitas, California. The San Elijo Lagoon Nature Center in Encinitas also has Shaw's agaves planted as part of their California native plant xeriscaping.

=== By indigenous peoples ===
The coastal agave (Tiipai: me'ellh, ma'alh, ma'alh jas'ilh, Paipai: me'elh jas'ilh ruii kiyak) was widely utilized by indigenous peoples until the European colonization of the Americas forced natives away from the coastal region where Agave shawii occurs. Subsequently, the lack of interaction between native peoples and their agaves led to the decay of knowledge regarding the usage of the local agaves, with the cultivation of agaves in the entire Kumeyaay-Paipai cultural region now only occurring in the village of Santa Catarina.

The Spanish explorers and missionaries from Sebastián Vizcaíno and Junipero Serra's expeditions noticed the usage of the agave for fiber and food. Serra said on his arrival to the coast near El Descanso, "We saw the land was covered with very good mescal but I think the Indians pay little attention to it due to the abundance of fish and other foods." Serra's observations fail to take into account the seasonal changes in the food supply, as the agave was heavily utilized in other months. Juan Crespí stated that the related Agave deserti was "...a delicious, sweet preserve. This is the wretched heathens' daily bread."

Agaves had high importance for indigenous food networks, but today the laborious effort of preparing the agaves is rarely undertaken. Preparation of the agave for consumption included locating suitable heads, using a digging stick to extract the heads, constructing an earth oven, where the agave head would be cooked for two days before it was ready to eat. Importance of the agave as a food is supported by archaeological records showing high dental attrition in the remains of indigenous peoples, likely due to the frequent consumption of tough plant fibers from the agave.

The fiber of the agave would have been put to a great variety of uses, for making belts, bowstrings, carrying nets, cordage, sandals, and other indispensable items. Vizcaíno noted that the cordage was used by fishermen to create lines of much higher quality than his own. Some Paipai women still produce agave fiber products today, from A. deserti, which are sold as handicrafts, but also offer to teach both natives and non-natives throughout the region.

== Gallery ==
Agave shawii subsp. shawii

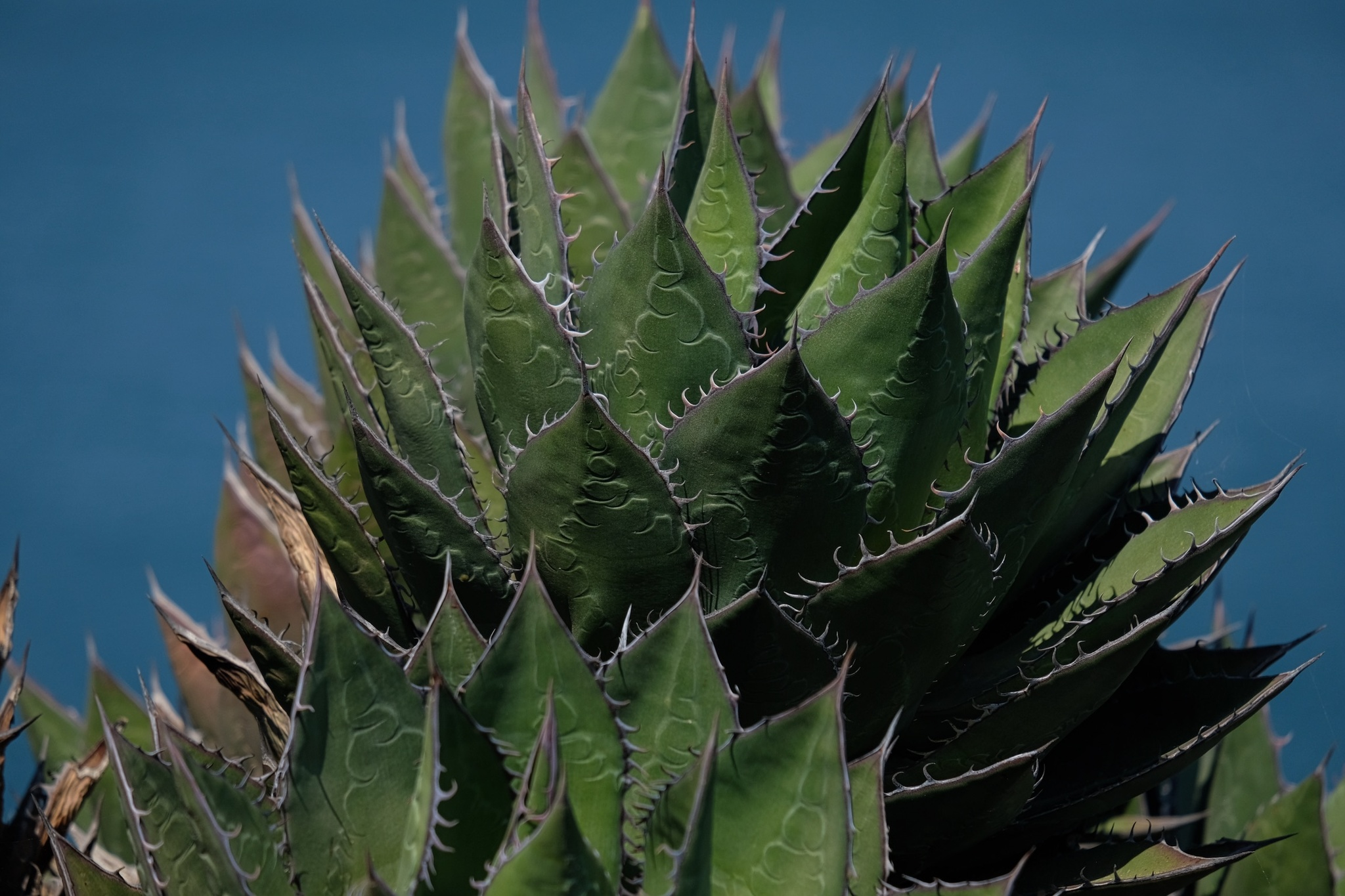
A rosette, with the water of San Diego Bay in the background

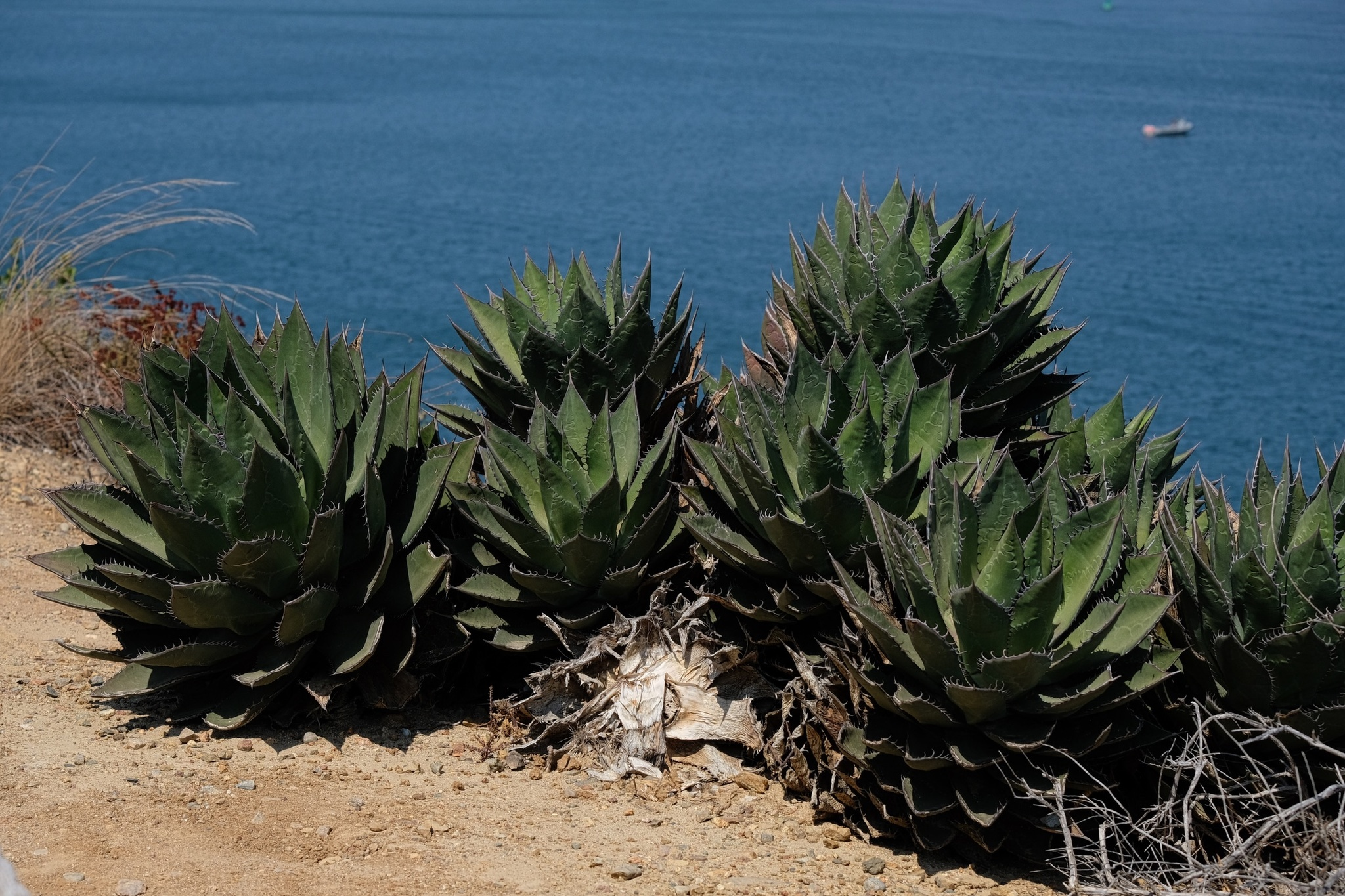
A planted colony overlooking San Diego Bay

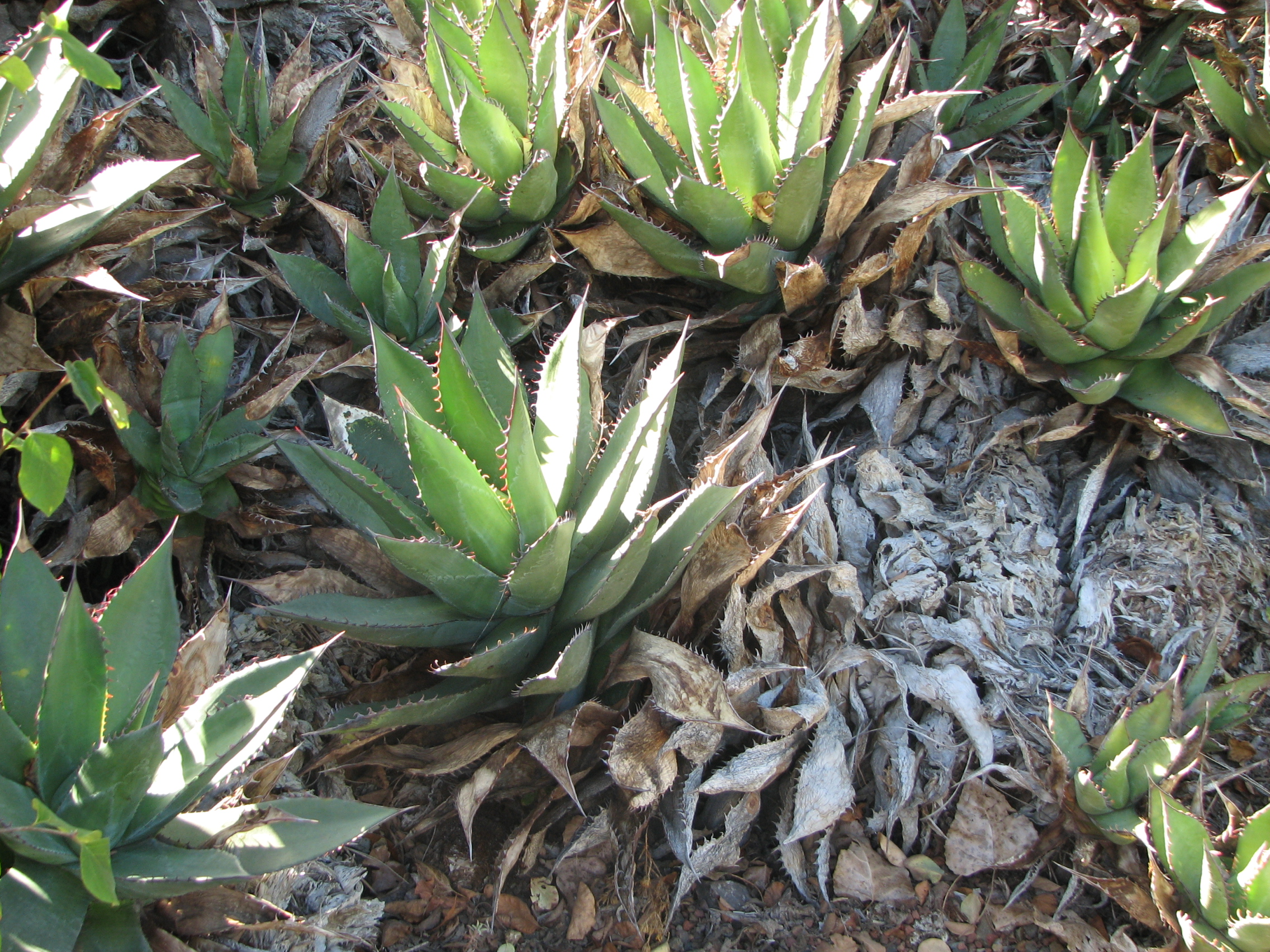
A cluster of rosettes

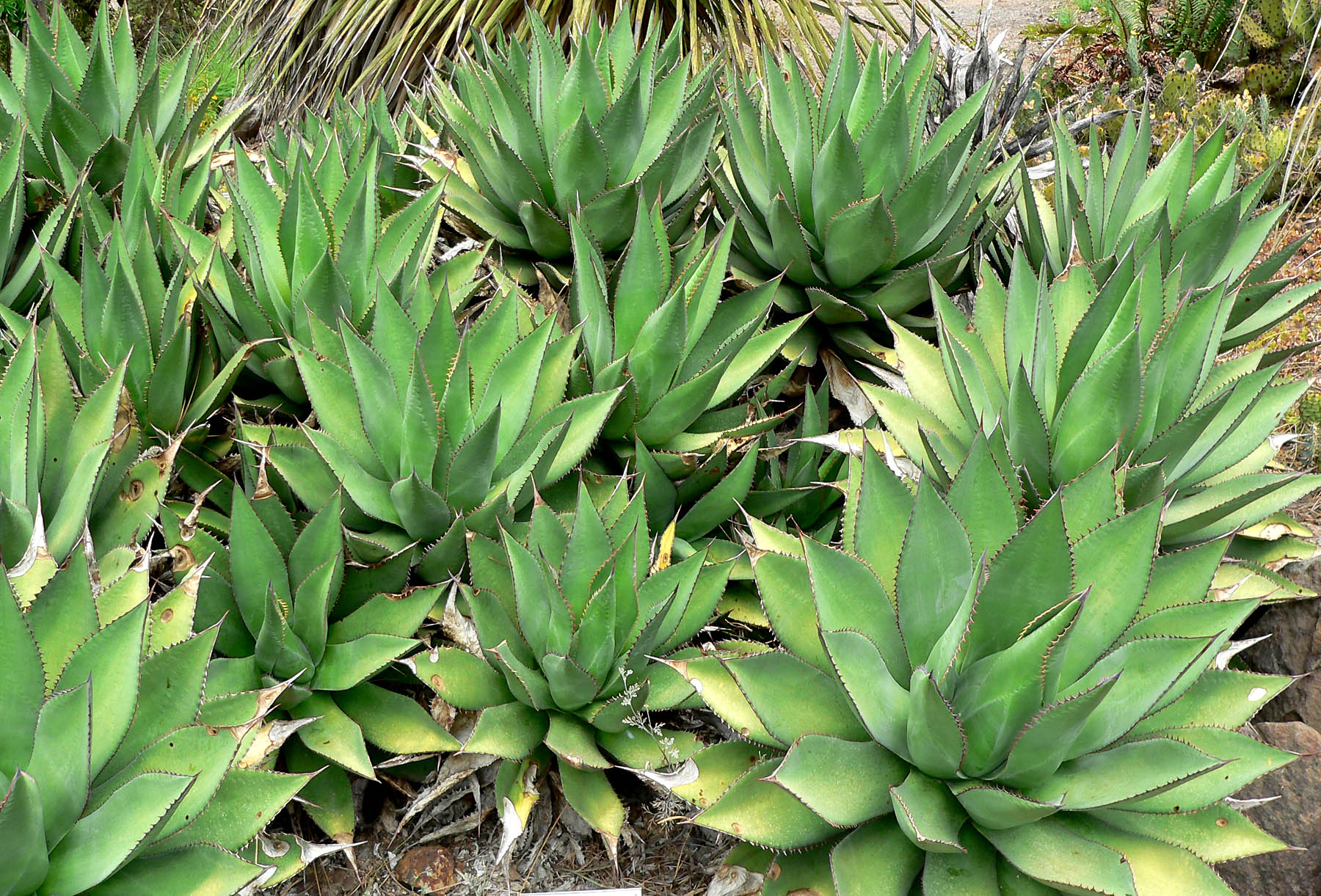
At the Regional Parks Botanic Garden

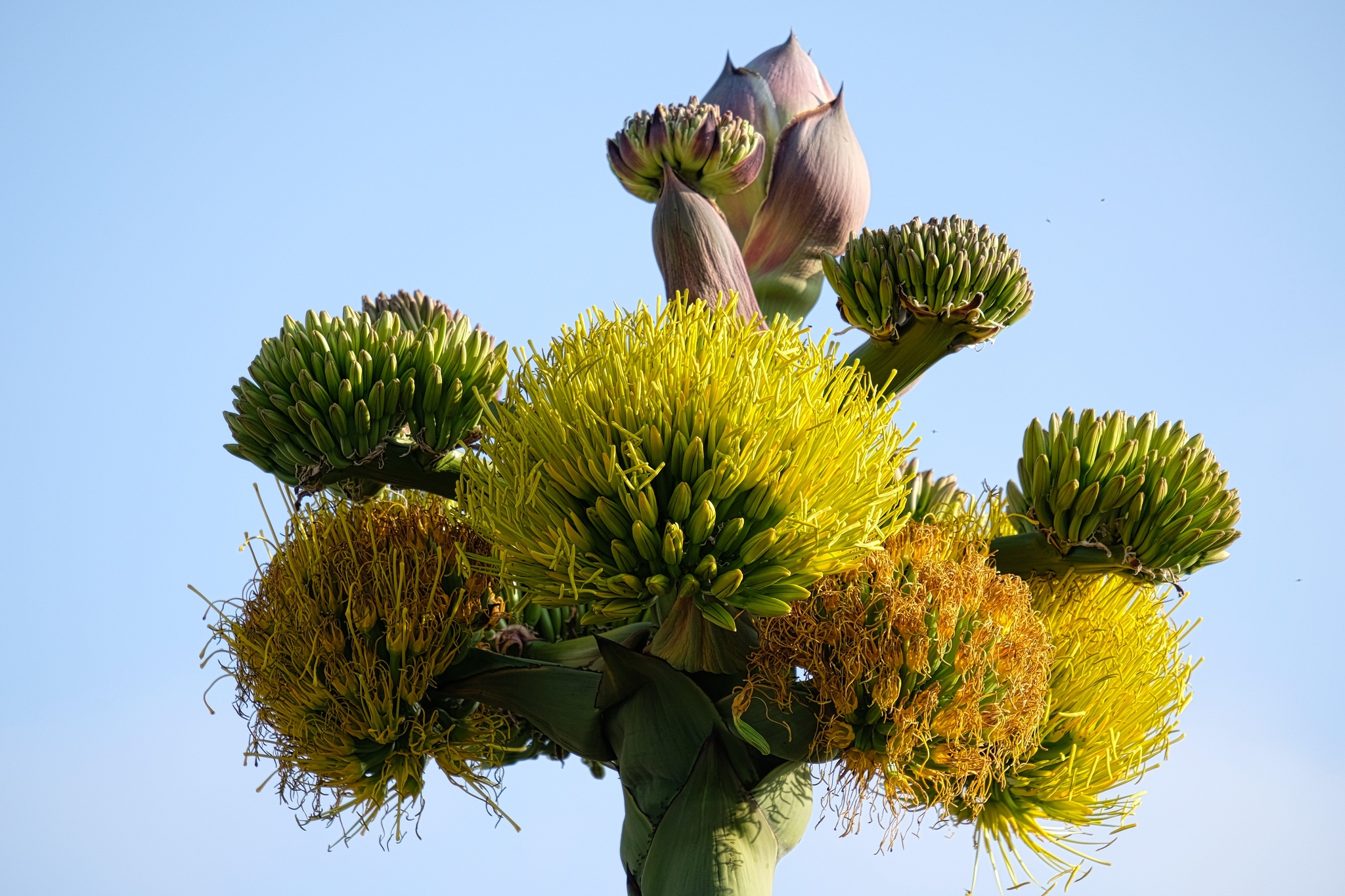
The tip of the inflorescence

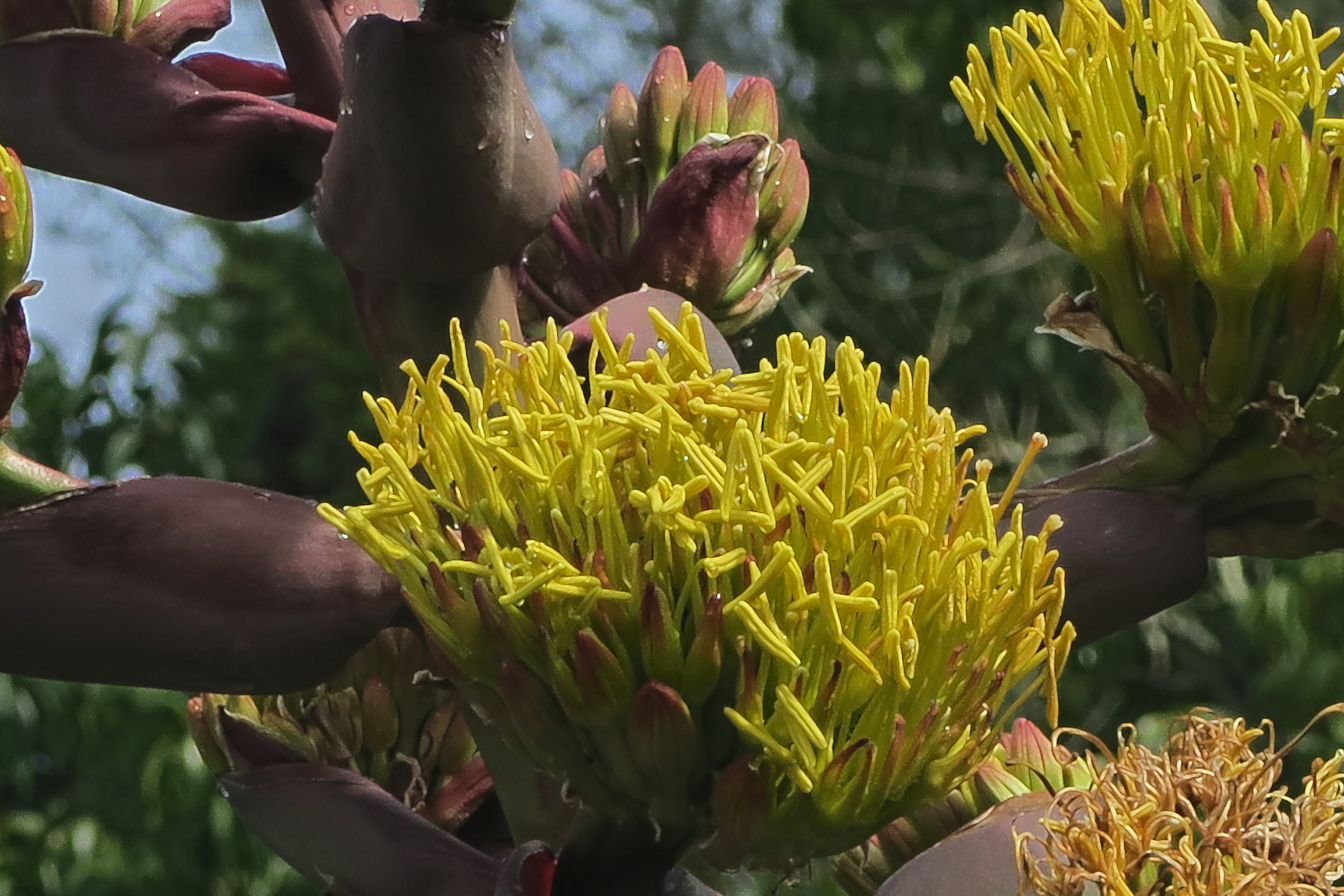
Detail of the flowers
Agave shawii subsp. goldmaniana

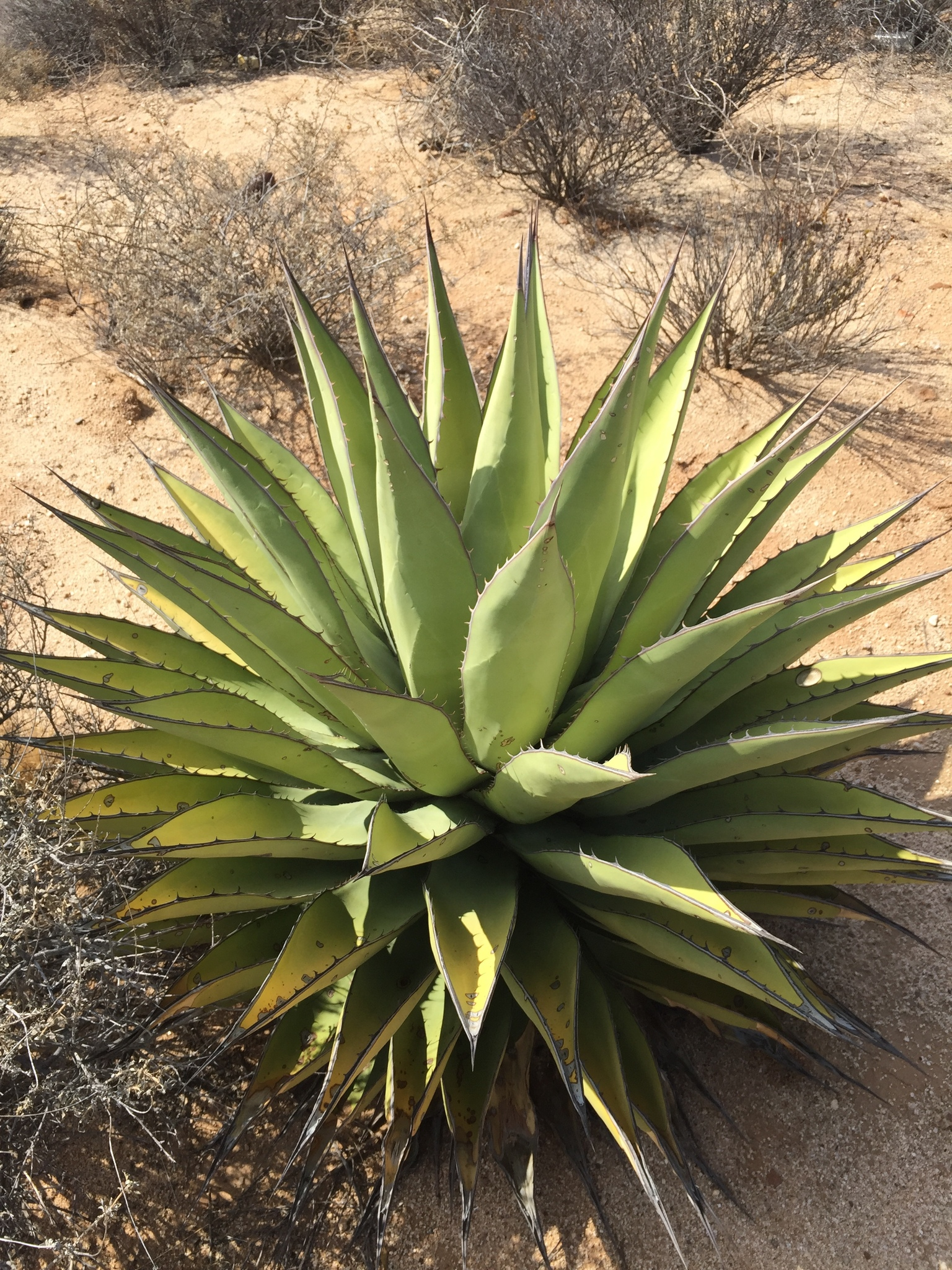
A plant with one rosette

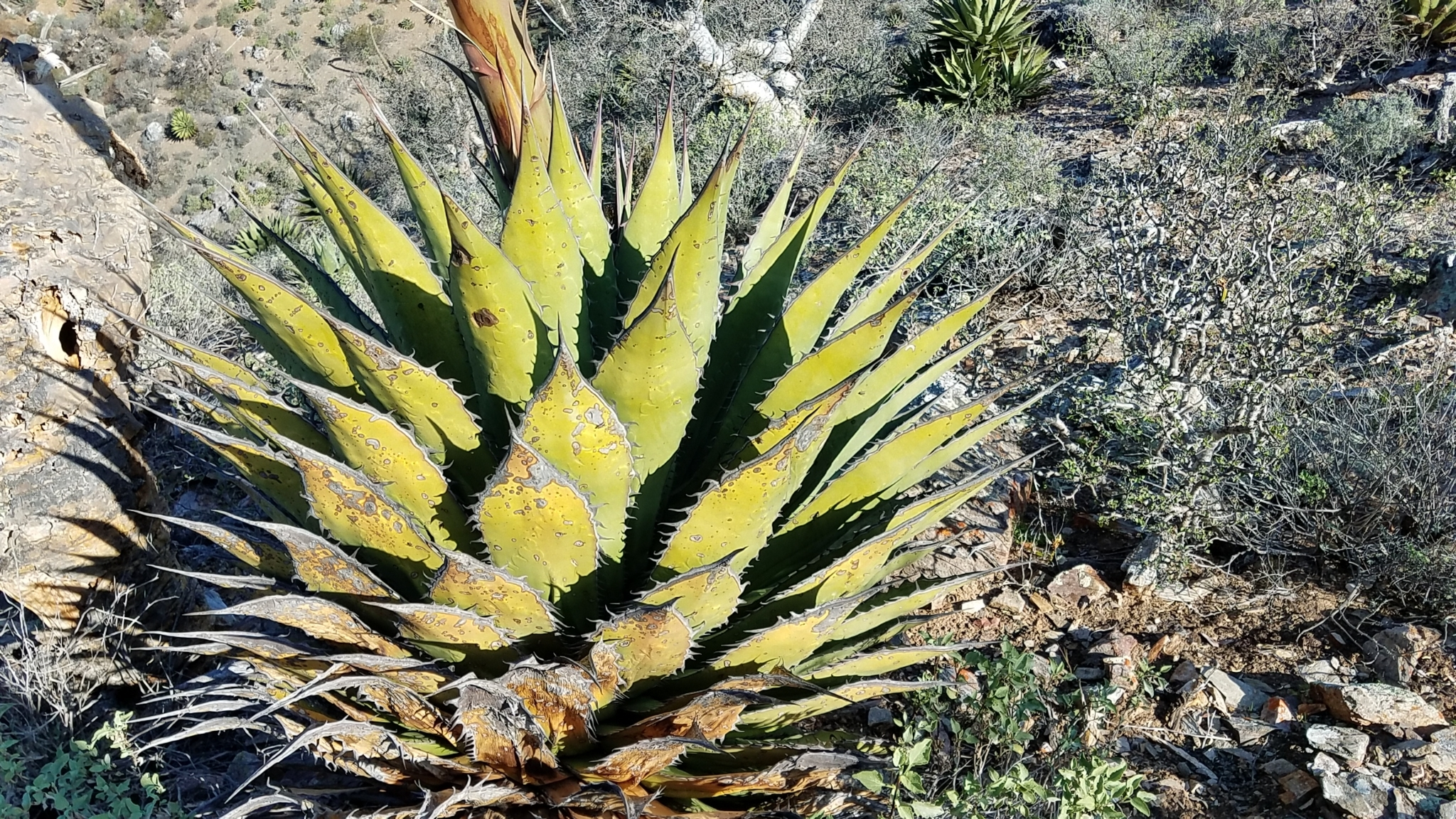
A rosette with the inflorescence emerging out of frame

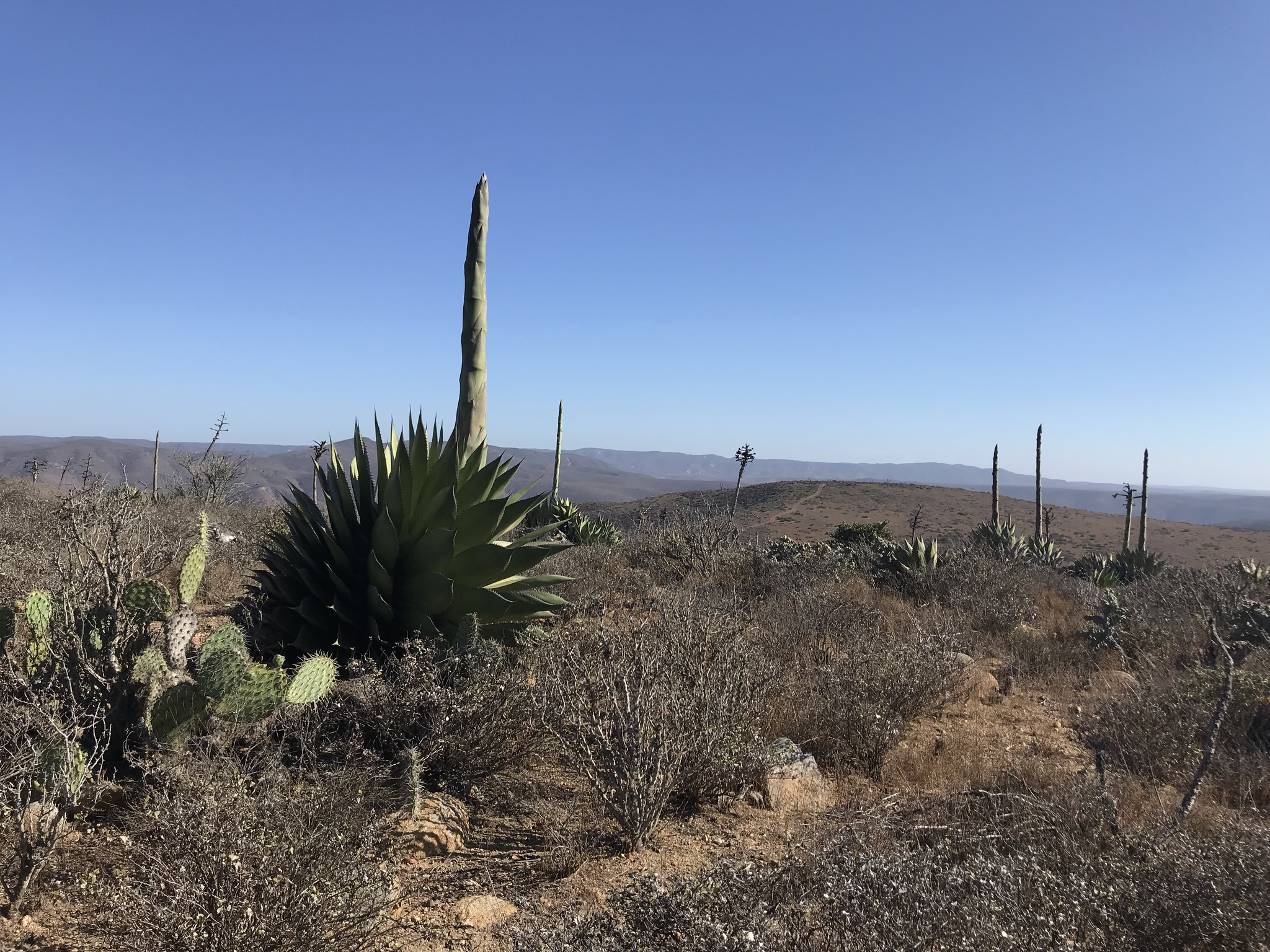
Numerous plants preparing to flower

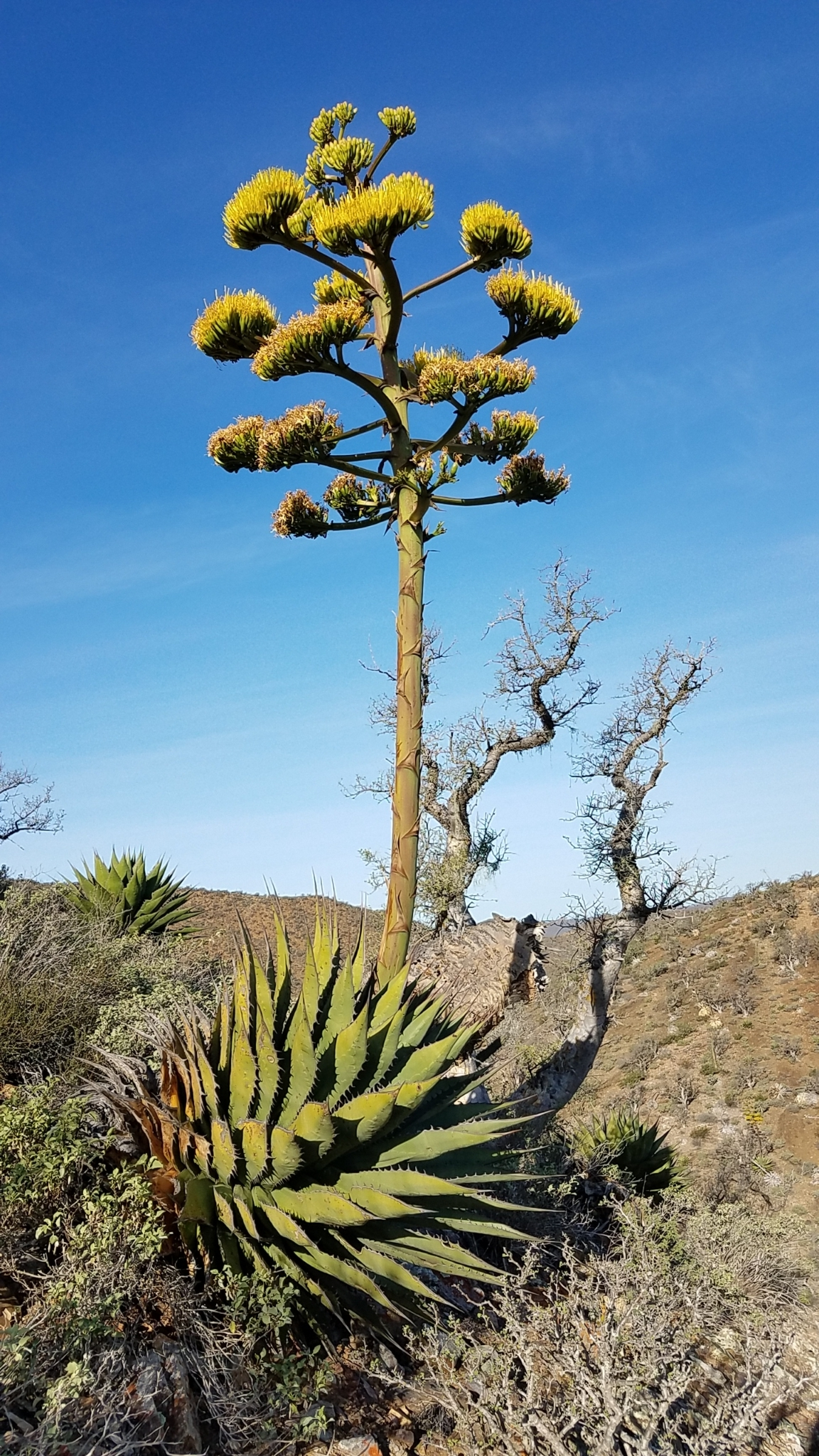
A plant in flower

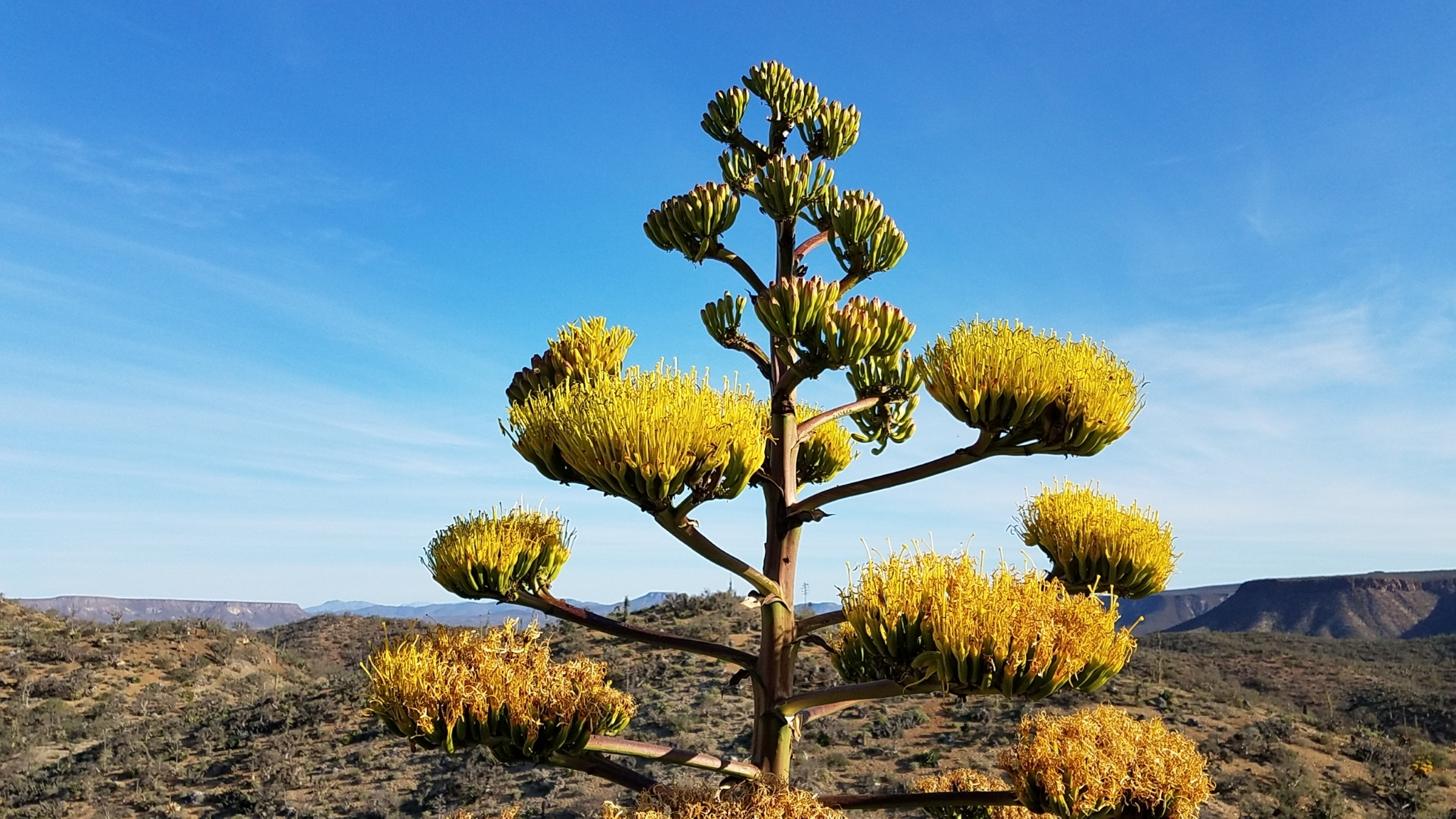
The inflorescence

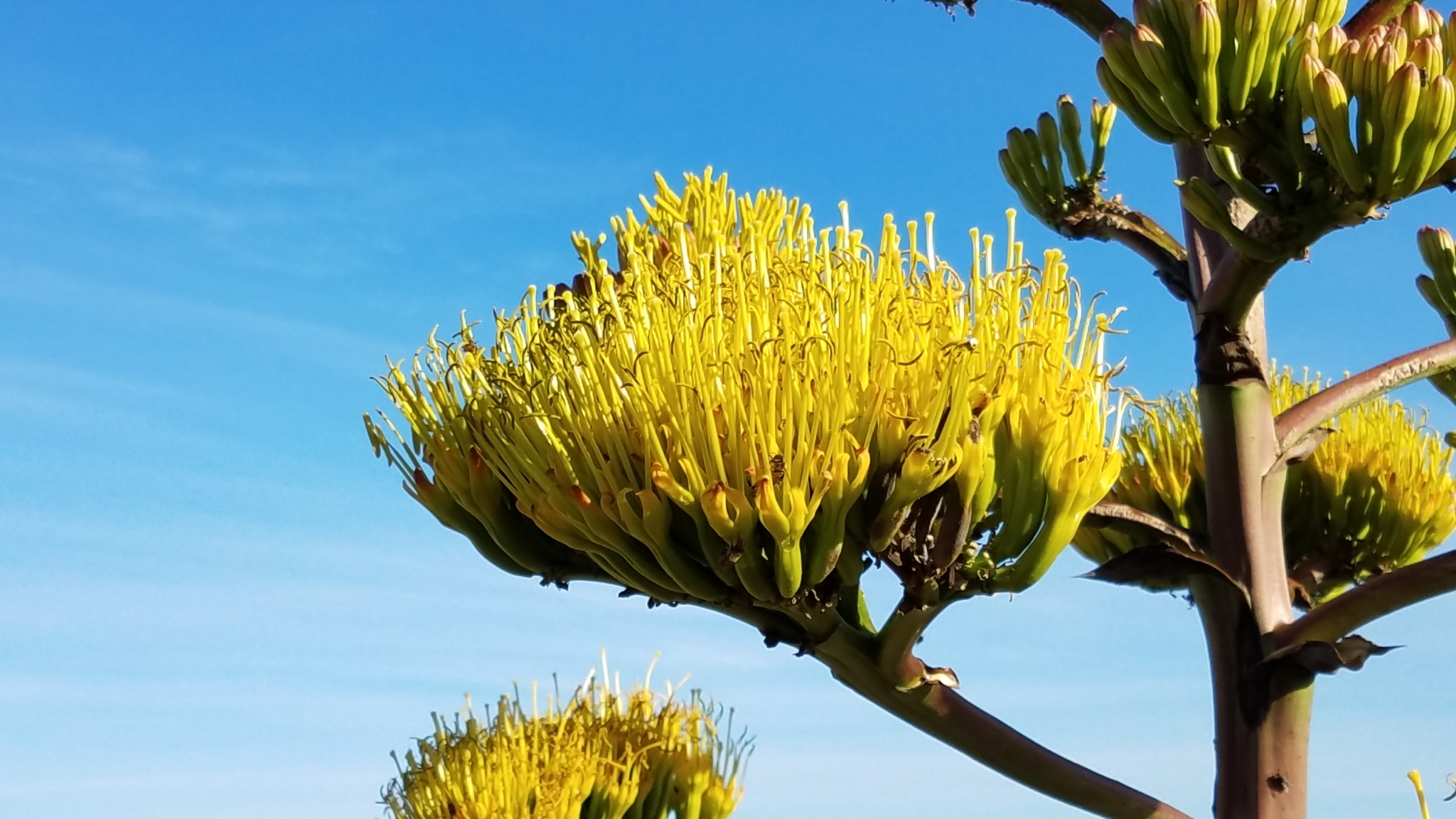
Detail of the flowers

== See also ==
Other flora of the maritime succulent scrub:

- Bergerocactus emoryi
- Dudleya attenuata
- Ceanothus verrucosus
