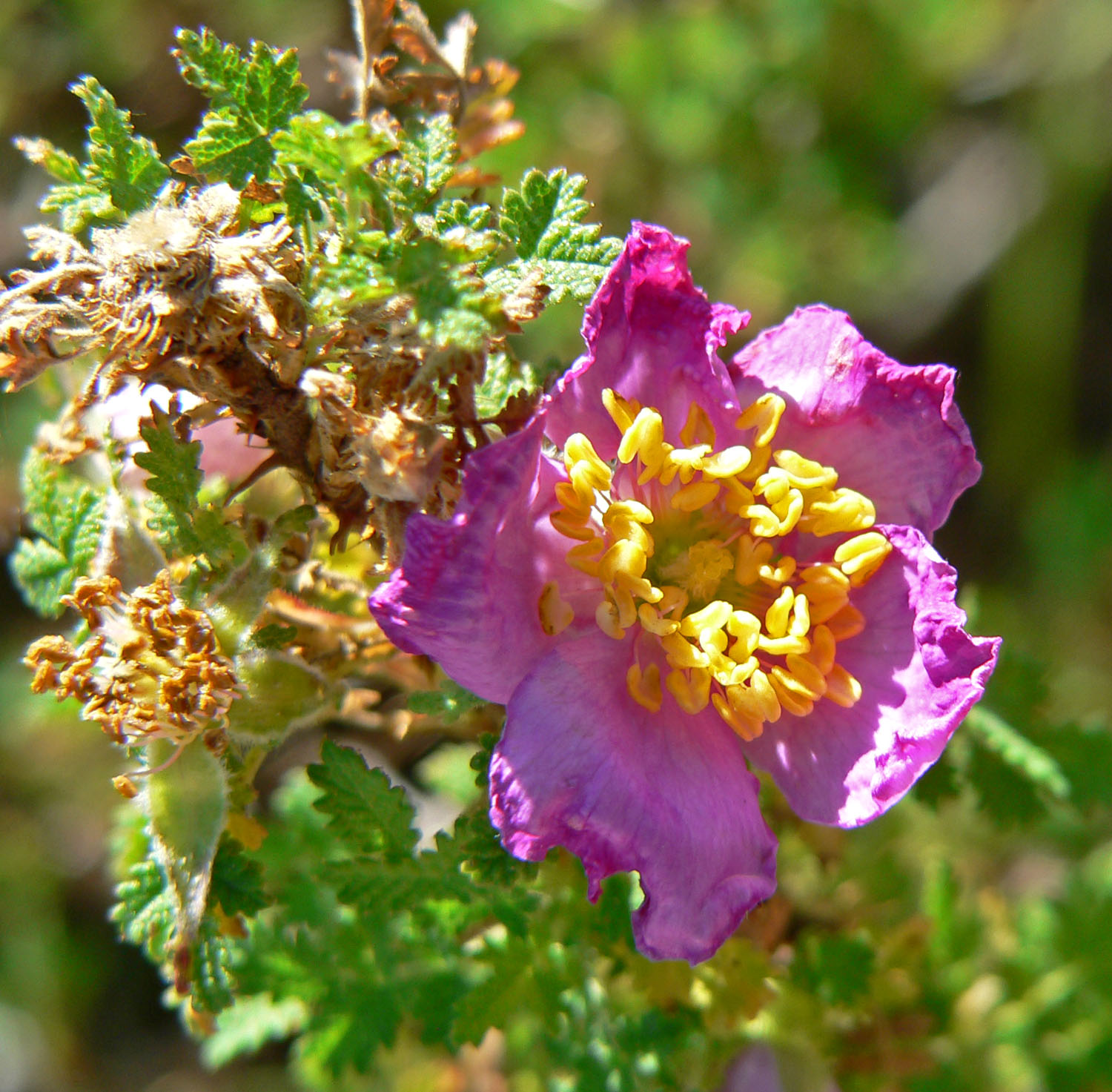

Scientific classification
- Kingdom: Plantae
- Clade: Tracheophytes
- Clade: Angiosperms
- Clade: Eudicots
- Clade: Rosids
- Order: Rosales
- Family: Rosaceae
- Genus: Rosa
- Species: R. minutifolia

Binomial name
- Rosa minutifolia Engelm.

= Rosa minutifolia =

Species of flowering plant

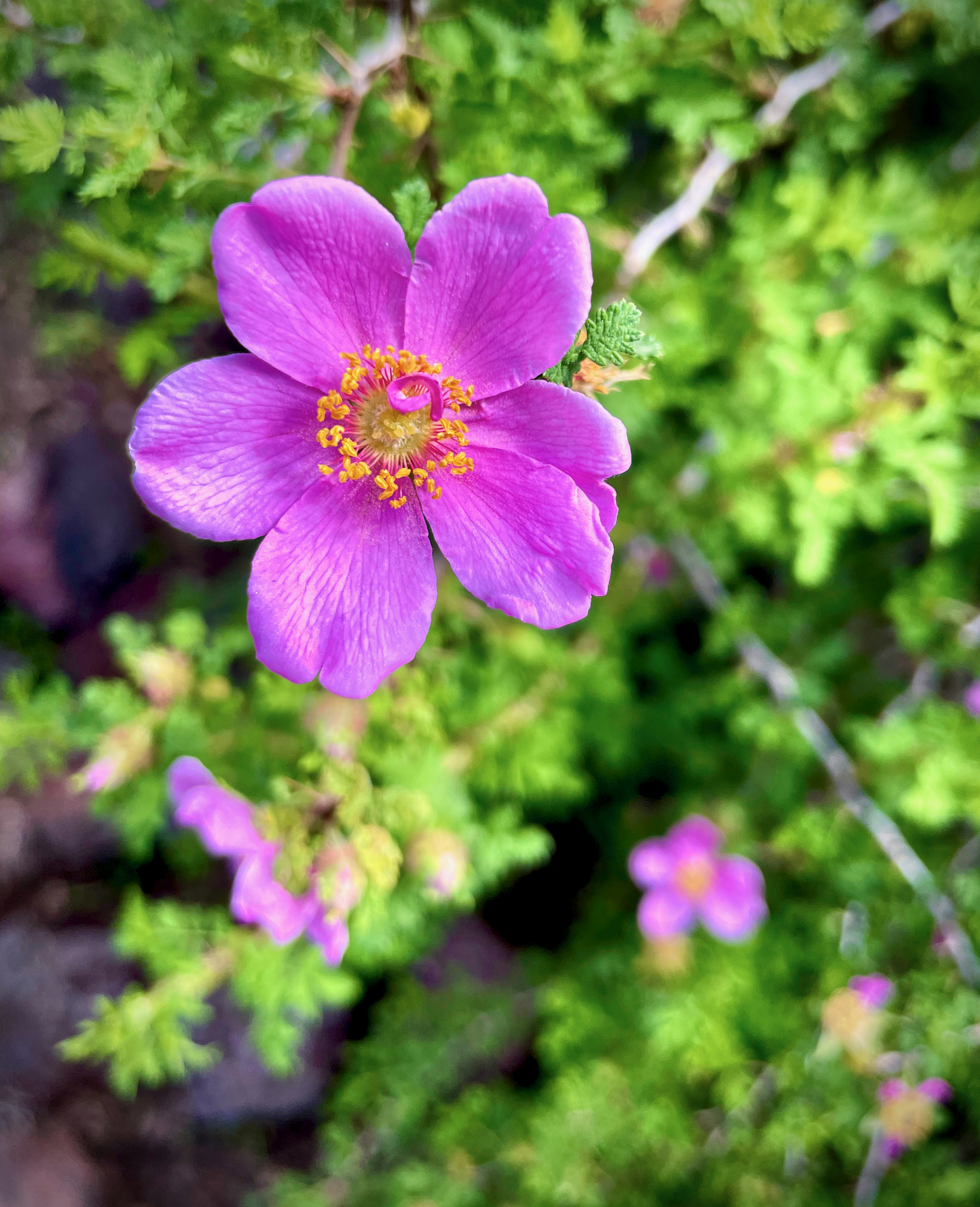
Rosa minutifolia in the Huntington Desert Garden.

Rosa minutifolia is a species in the genus Rosa. It is also known by the common names Baja rose, Baja littleleaf rose, and small-leaved rose.

== Description ==
Dense shrub or thicket-forming perennial, found in chaparral plant communities. In fact, it is exceptionally drought tolerant, particularly if given a thick layer of organic mulch; under drought stress the plant defoliates, exposing a small thicket of woody, and extremely spiny stems.

Height/spread: 30–100 cm (1m) high and wide.

Stems: Stems are low and arching, with many, generally unpaired, straight, slender prickles measuring 2-12mm in length.

Leaves: The leaves of Rosa minutifolia are the smallest of the genus Rosa, with the terminal leaflets measuring 3-6mm long and wide. Leaves are round, widest near the middle, tip shape to obtuse, with toothed margins about halfway to the midvein, glandless. The leaf axil is finely short-hairy and sparsely glandular. Leaflets are hairy and number 5-7.

Flowers: Inflorescences are generally one-flowered, pedicels are hairy and glandless, and measure to about 2-10mm in length. Flowers have a hypanthium to around 3mm wide. Densely prickly neck to 2mm wide. Sepals have toothed lateral lobes and are glandless, with the tip generally being about equal to the body, which is also toothed. Flowers typically contain 10 pistils each. Petals measure 10-20mm and are deep pink, pale pink, or rarely white. Flowers appear in late winter, February–April. R. minutifolia is the earliest flowering of native California roses.

Fruit: Fruit shape is typically spherical, about 5mm in width. Sepals persistent, erect to spreading; achenes unknown.

== Distribution and range ==
Native to the chaparral plant community of northern Baja California, where wild populations are extant, and San Diego County, California, where it is now extinct in the wild.

== Cultivation ==
Rosa minutifolia is grown in gardens as an ornamental.

== Etymology and naming ==
'Minutifolia'– 'with very small leaves' from 'minuti', meaning 'minute', and 'folium', meaning 'leaves'. 'Rosa' from the Latin name 'rosa' meaning 'rose'.

The name Rosa minutifolia was previously disputed, as some believed it to be in its own genus, Hesperhodos. However, the name has since been resolved.
