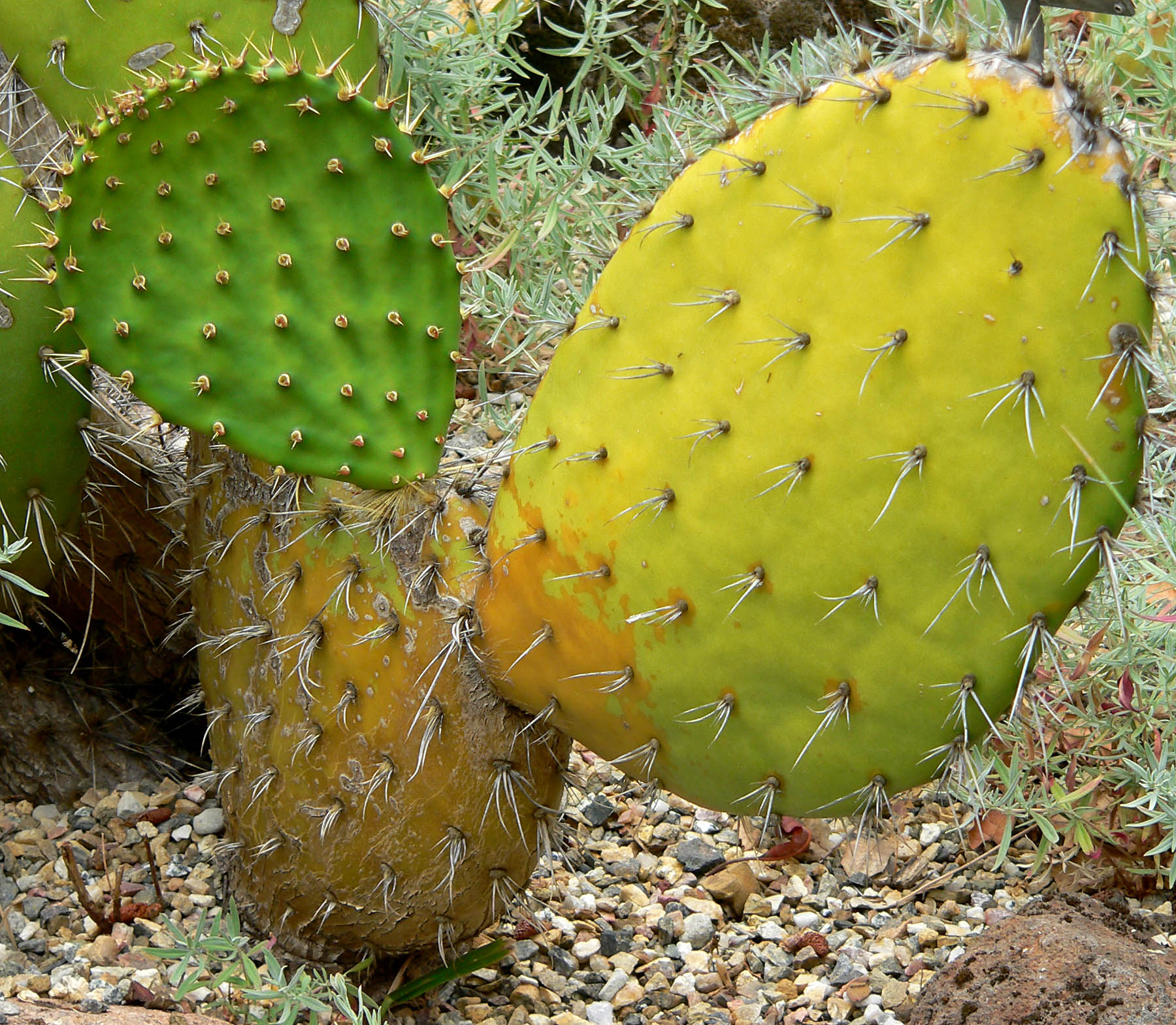

Conservation status
- Least Concern (IUCN 3.1)

Scientific classification
- Kingdom: Plantae
- Clade: Tracheophytes
- Clade: Angiosperms
- Clade: Eudicots
- Order: Caryophyllales
- Family: Cactaceae
- Genus: Opuntia
- Species: O. oricola

Binomial name
- Opuntia oricola Philbrick

= Opuntia oricola =

Species of cactus

Opuntia oricola is a species of prickly pear cactus known by the common name chaparral prickly pear.

== Description ==
Opuntia oricola is a large treelike cactus often exceeding 2 meters in height. The branches are made up of rounded flat segments up to 25 centimeters long. It is covered in clusters of curved, yellowish spines usually around 2 centimeters long.

The flowers are yellow, sometimes orange-tinged. The spherical fruit is purplish red on the outside, whitish and juicy inside, and up to 6 centimeters long. It was common along the coasts and adjacent inland areas of California, but development has reduced its populations.

== Distribution and habitat ==
The plant is native to southern California and Baja California, where it grows in coastal sage scrub and chaparral habitats.
