= Cneoraceae =

Family of plants

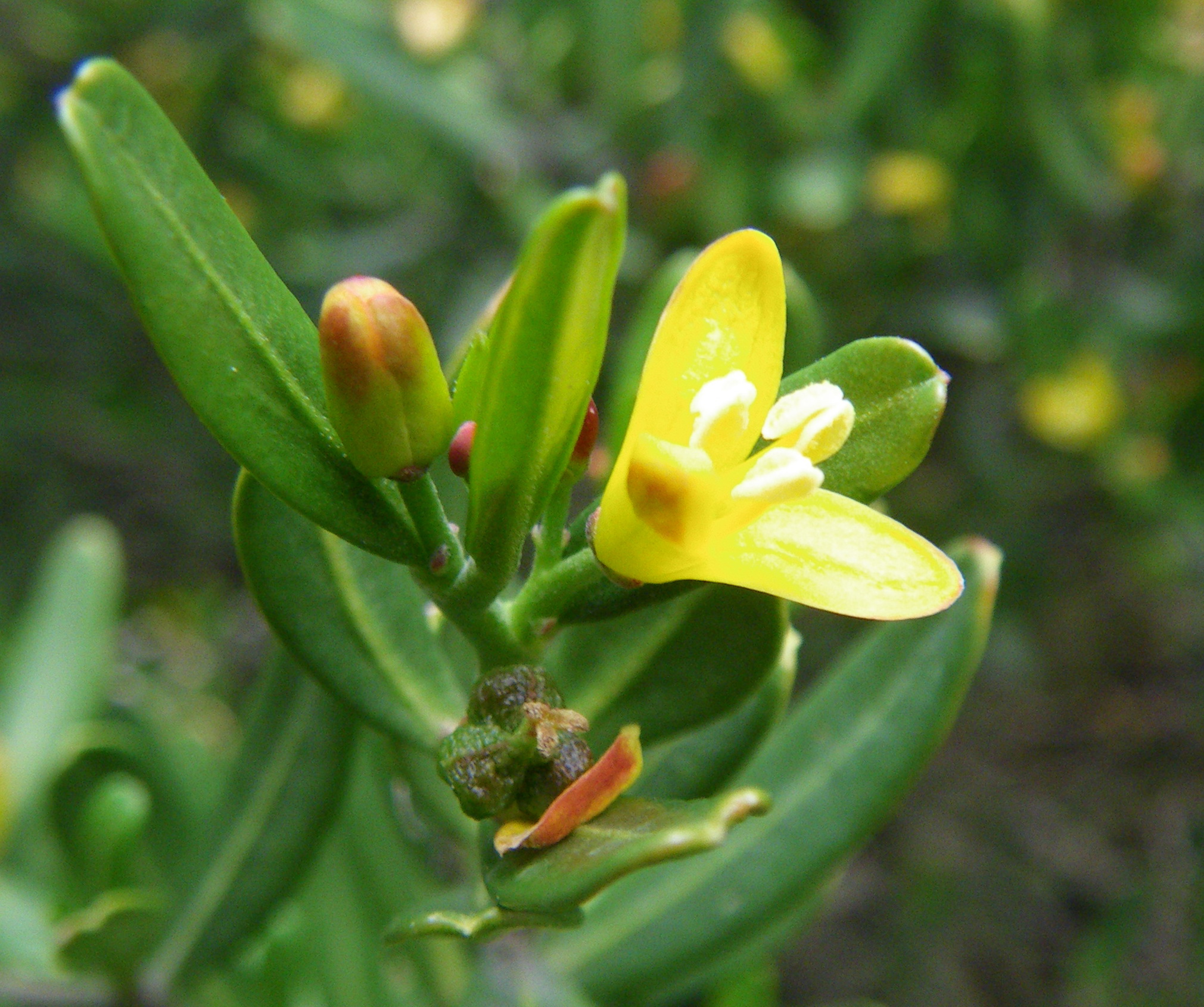
Cneorum tricoccon

Cneoraceae was a relict family of Mediterranean shrubs that evolved under tropical conditions during the Cenozoic era. It is a dicot that generally favours higher altitudes and is rich in tannin. It produces both hermaphrodite and male flowers, but the male flowers produce more fertile pollen, leading to a fruit.

There are two genera and six species in tropical Africa, South and Southeast Asia, northern Australia, the Canary Islands, the northwestern Mediterranean, Cuba and China. The genera are Cneorum and Harrisonia.

The APG II and APG III systems have assigned these genera to the subfamily Spathelioideae in the citrus family, Rutaceae.
