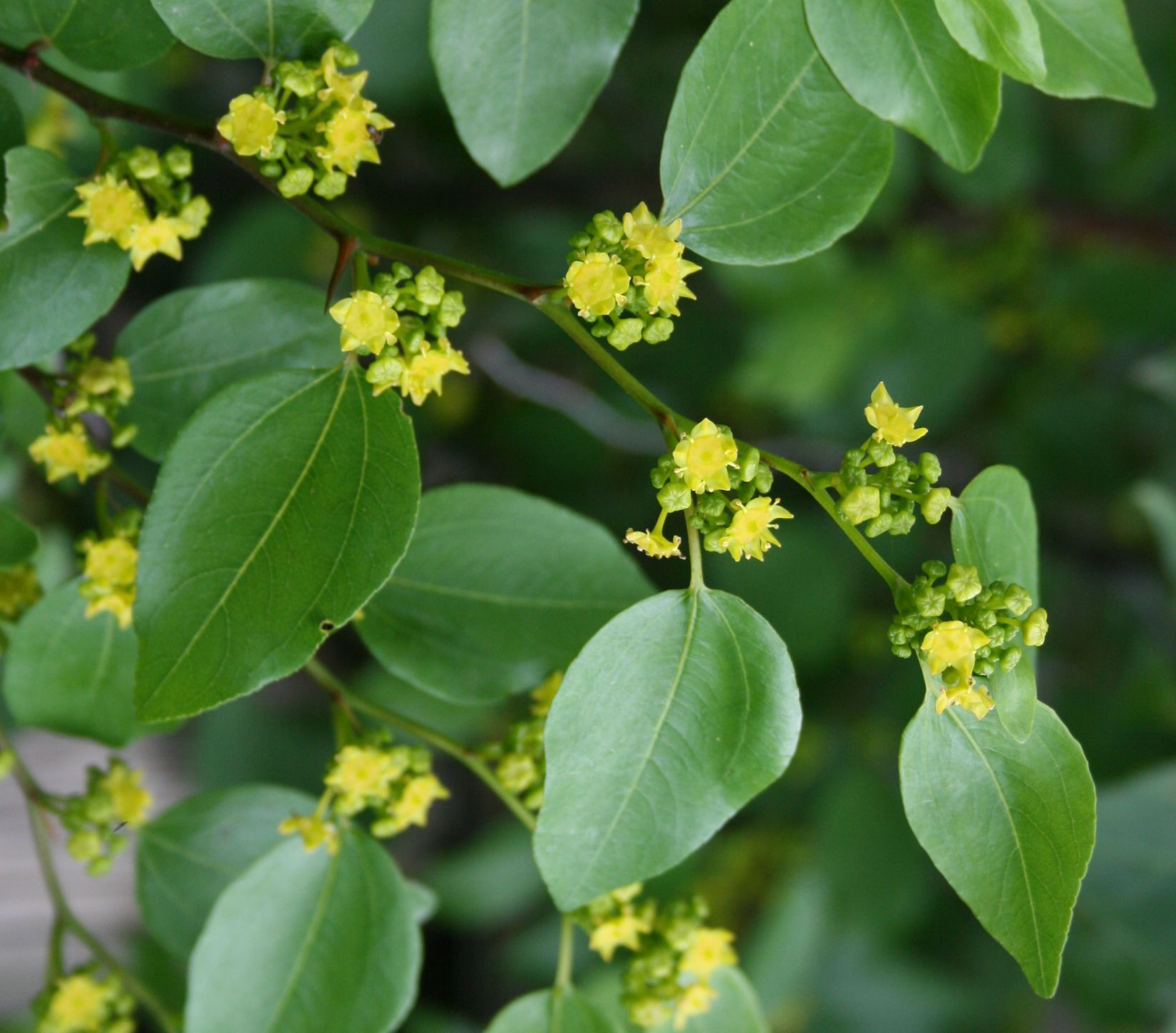
- Paliurus spina-christi

Scientific classification
- Kingdom: Plantae
- Clade: Tracheophytes
- Clade: Angiosperms
- Clade: Eudicots
- Clade: Rosids
- Order: Rosales
- Family: Rhamnaceae
- Tribe: Paliureae
- Genus: Paliurus; Mill.

Species
- See text

Synonyms
- Aubletia Lour.

= Paliurus =

Paliurus Temporal range: Maastrichtian - recent

Genus of flowering plants

Paliurus is a genus of flowering plants in the family Rhamnaceae. The eight species are native to warm, dry regions of Eurasia and North Africa from Morocco and Spain east to Japan and Taiwan.

== Description ==
They are shrubs or small trees growing to 3–15 m tall. The shoots are zig-zagged, with a leaf and two stipular spines on the outside of each kink. The leaves are deciduous or evergreen, oval, 2–10 cm long and 1–7 cm broad, glossy green, with three conspicuous veins at the base, and an entire or bluntly toothed margin. The fruit is a dry woody nutlet centred in a circular wing 1–3.5 cm diameter.

== Ecology ==
Paliurus species are used as food plants by the larvae of some Lepidoptera species including the Bucculatrix leaf-miners B. albella (feeds exclusively on P. spina-christi), B. paliuricola (feeds exclusively on Paliurus spp.) and B. turatii (feeds exclusively on P. aculeatus).

== Selected species ==
- Paliurus hemsleyanus Rehder ex Schirarend & Olabi (Southern China)
- Paliurus orientalis (Franch.) Hemsl. (Central China)
- Paliurus ramosissimus (Lour.) Poir. (Eastern Asia)
- Paliurus spina-christi Mill.

=== Formerly placed here ===
- Dracontomelon dao (Blanco) Merr. & Rolfe (as P. dao Blanco or P. edulis Blanco)
- Harrisonia perforata (Blanco) Merr. (as P. perforata Blanco)
