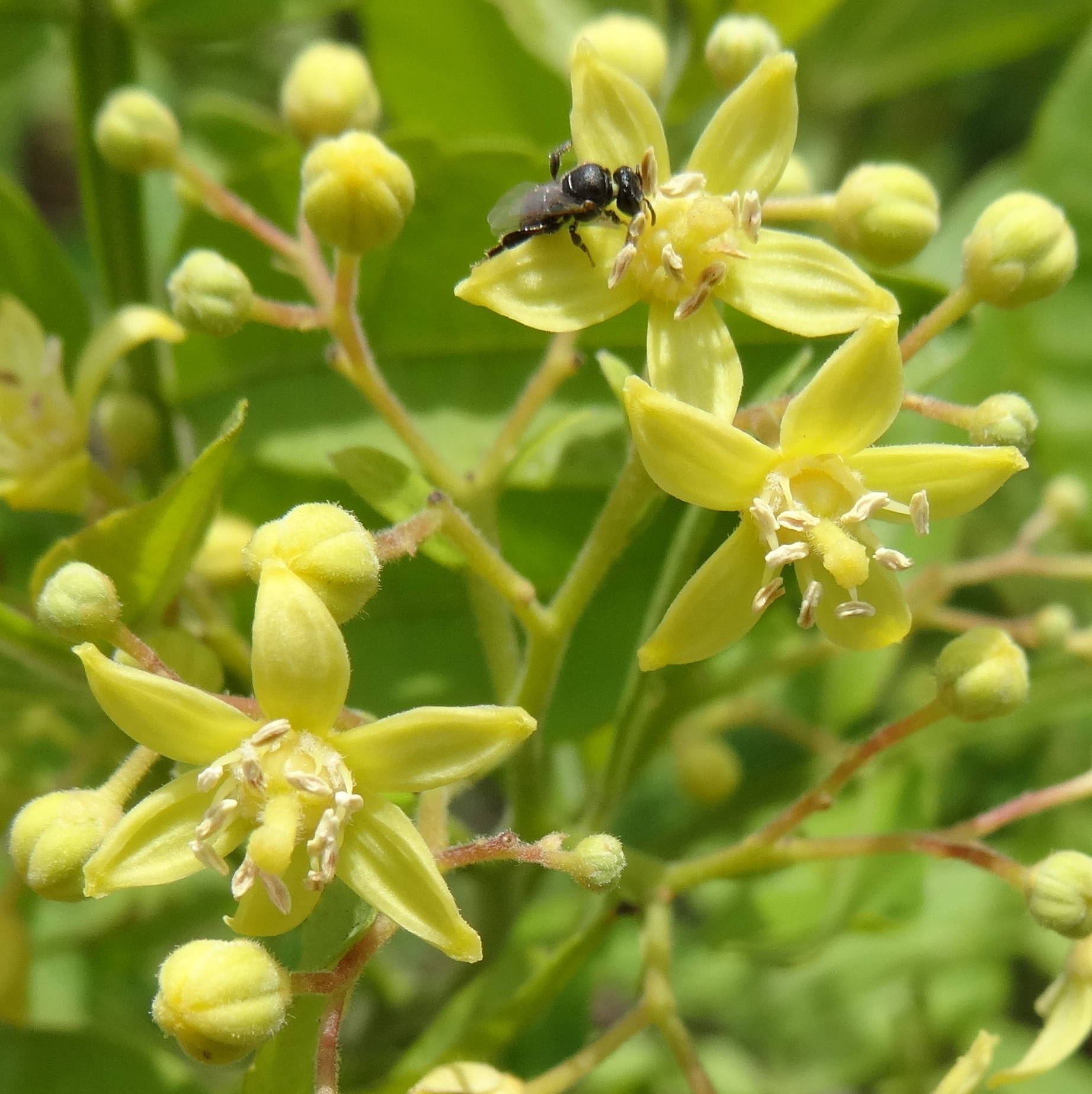

Conservation status
- Least Concern (IUCN 3.1)

Scientific classification
- Kingdom: Plantae
- Clade: Tracheophytes
- Clade: Angiosperms
- Clade: Eudicots
- Clade: Rosids
- Order: Sapindales
- Family: Rutaceae
- Subfamily: Cneoroideae
- Genus: Harrisonia
- Species: H. abyssinica

Binomial name
- Harrisonia abyssinica Oliv.

Synonyms
- Clausena impunctata Welw. ex Hiern; Ebelingia abyssinica (Oliv.) Kuntze; Ebelingia occidentalis (Engl.) Kuntze; Fagara guineensis (Stapf) De Wild.; Harrisonia occidentalis Engl.; Zanthoxylum guineense Stapf

= Harrisonia abyssinica =

Species of tree

Harrisonia abyssinica is a species of shrub or small tree in the family Rutaceae. Native to Tropical Africa, its habitat is usually in transitional zones between deciduous woodlands and evergreen forest.

== Description ==
Harrisonia abyssinica grows up to 6 m (20 ft) tall with spines up to 2 cm (0.8 in) long on outgrowths on the branches. It flowers from August to November with white to yellow petals. The fruits are red to black, 4–9 cm (1.6–3.5 in) in diameter and edible.

== Medicinal properties ==
The roots and bark from the stem are used to treat gonorrhoea, dysentery and tuberculosis as well as an ascaricide.
