= Perigrapha mundoides =

Scientific classification
- Kingdom: Animalia
- Phylum: Arthropoda
- Clade: Pancrustacea
- Class: Insecta
- Order: Lepidoptera
- Superfamily: Noctuoidea
- Family: Noctuidae
- Genus: Perigrapha
- Species: P. mundoides

Binomial name
- Perigrapha mundoides (Boursin, 1940)

Synonyms
- Monima rorida f. mundoides Boursin, 1940; Perigrapha (Rororthosia) mundoides

Species of moth

Perigrapha mundoides is a species of moth of the family Noctuidae. It is endemic to Israel, Lebanon and Jordan.

Adults are on wing from February to March. There is one generation per year. The larvae likely feed on crown of thorns (Paliurus spina-christi) and other related shrubs.
