= Spurge olive =

Spurge olive is a common name for several plants and may refer to:

- Cneorum tricoccon
- Species in the genus Daphne, particularly:
  - Daphne mezereum
Plants called spurge olive
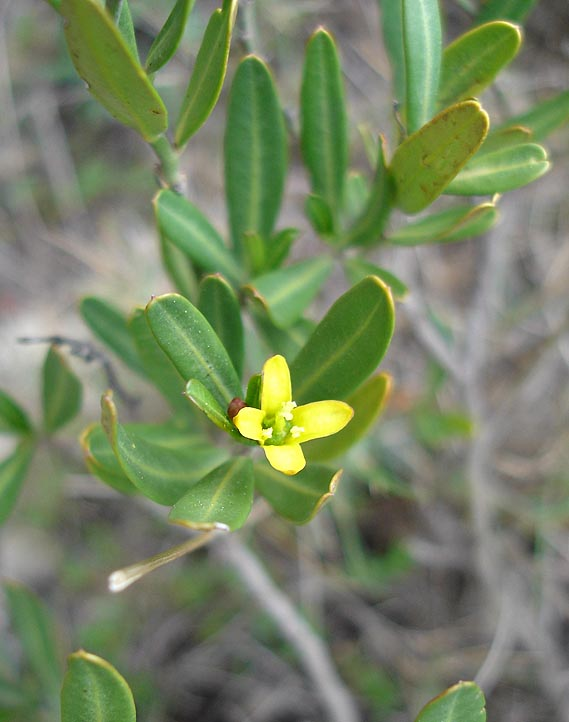
Cneorum tricoccon

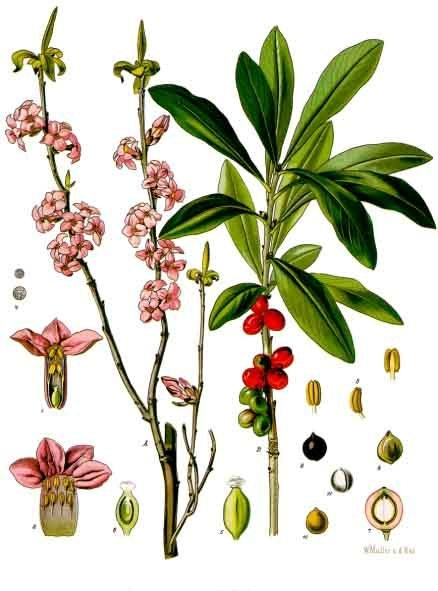
Daphne mezereum
