= Spathelia simplex =

Scientific classification
- Kingdom: Plantae
- Clade: Tracheophytes
- Clade: Angiosperms
- Clade: Eudicots
- Clade: Rosids
- Order: Sapindales
- Family: Rutaceae
- Genus: Spathelia
- Species: S. simplex

Binomial name
- Spathelia simplex L.

Synonyms
- Spathe simplex (L.) Crantz; Spathelia sorbifolia L.

Species of plant

Spathelia simplex, commonly called mountain pride or maypole tree, is a "palmoid" or "corner model tree" of the rainforest of Jamaica. It is in the citrus family (Rutaceae). Although the unbranched trunk may be up to 15 m (49 ft) in height, it is rarely over 8 cm (3.1 in) diameter at breast height. It is a monocarpic species (flowers and fruits once, then dies) producing a huge terminal thyrse of red flowers up to 1.5 m (4 ft 11 in) high by up to 2.5 m (8 ft 2 in) in width; exceeded only by Harmsiopanax ingens and Sohnreyia excelsa. The once-pinnate leaves are up to 1.5 m (4 ft 11 in) long.
