= Bottegoa =

Scientific classification
- Kingdom: Plantae
- Clade: Tracheophytes
- Clade: Angiosperms
- Clade: Eudicots
- Clade: Rosids
- Order: Sapindales
- Family: Rutaceae
- Subfamily: Cneoroideae
- Genus: Bottegoa; Chiov.

Genus of flowering plants

Bottegoa is a genus of plant in family Rutaceae. It contains the following species (but this list may be incomplete):

- Bottegoa insignis, Chiov.
