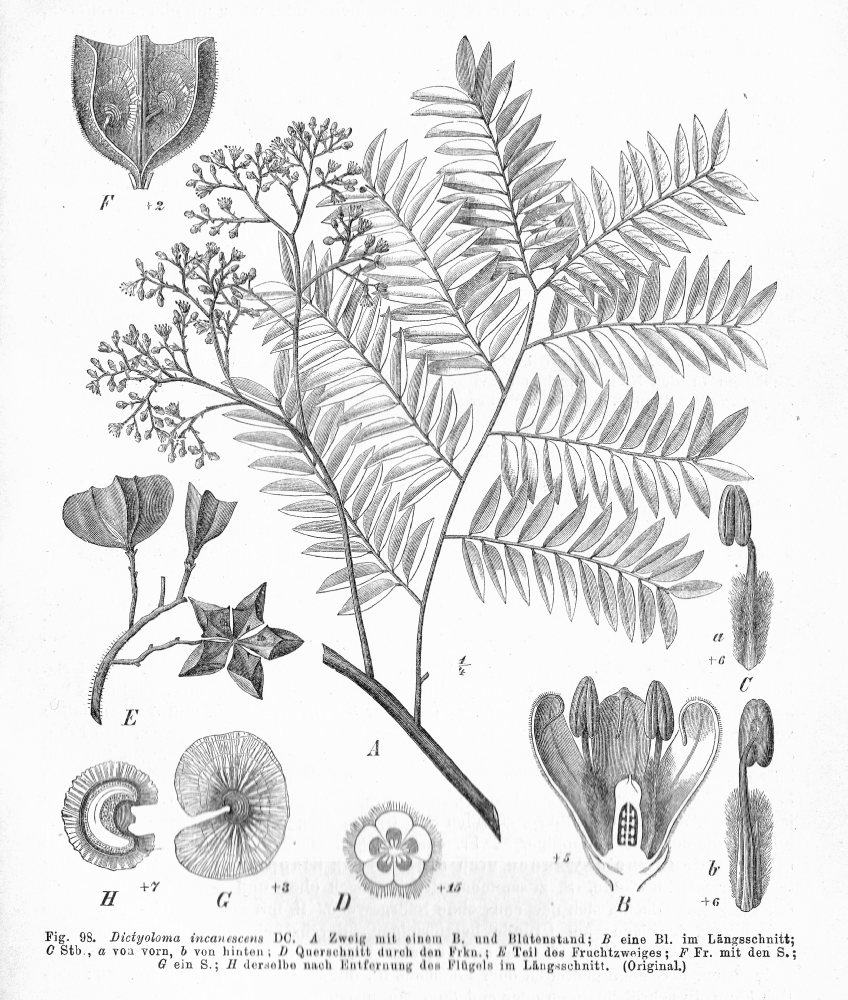
- Dictyoloma incanescens

Scientific classification
- Kingdom: Plantae
- Clade: Tracheophytes
- Clade: Angiosperms
- Clade: Eudicots
- Clade: Rosids
- Order: Sapindales
- Family: Rutaceae
- Subfamily: Cneoroideae
- Genus: Dictyoloma; A.Juss

Species
- Dictyoloma incanescens; Dictyoloma peruvianum; Dictyoloma vandellianum

= Dictyoloma =

Genus of flowering plants

Dictyoloma is a genus of flowering plants that belongs to the family Rutaceae.
