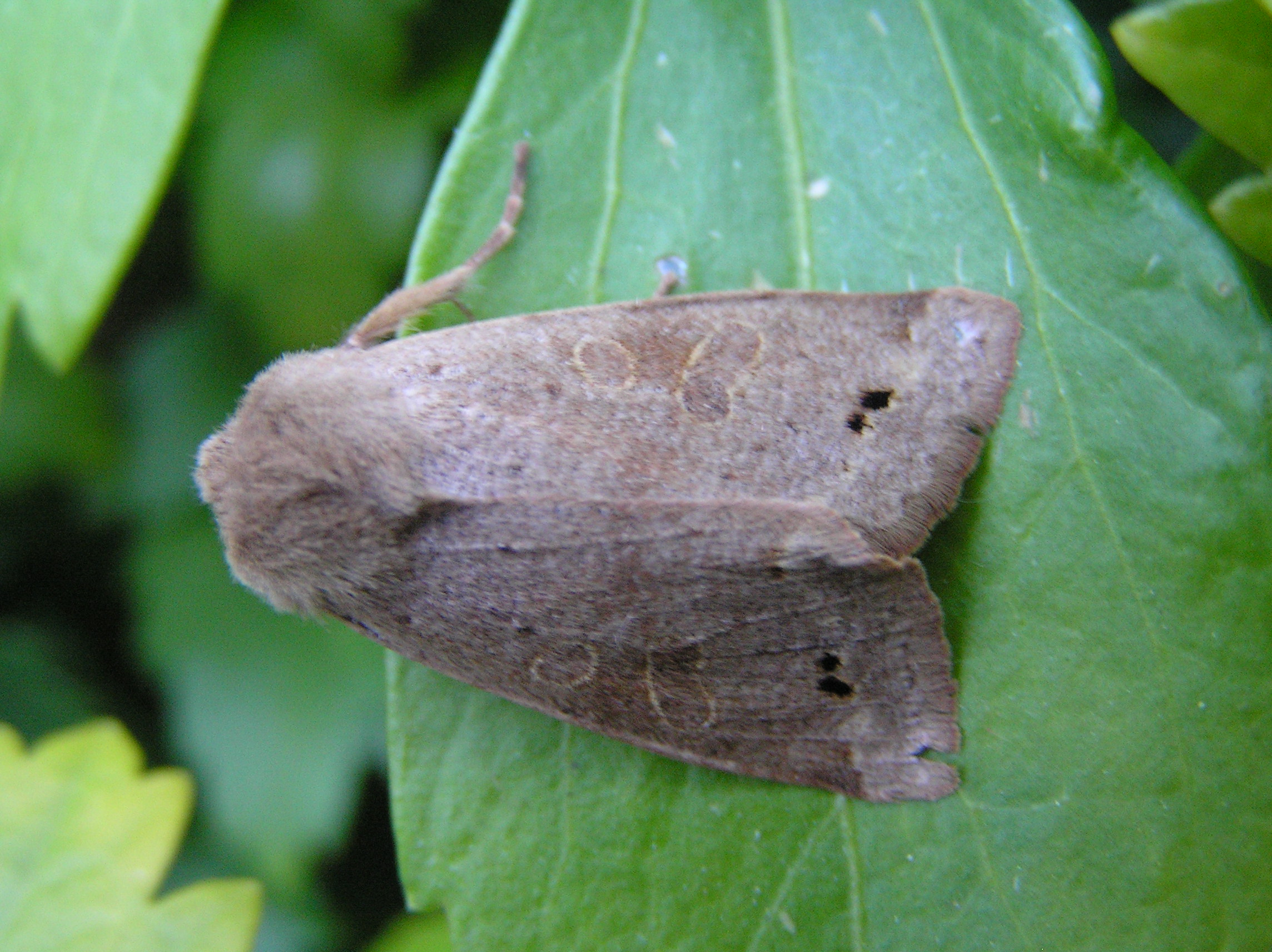

Scientific classification
- Domain: Eukaryota
- Kingdom: Animalia
- Phylum: Arthropoda
- Class: Insecta
- Order: Lepidoptera
- Superfamily: Noctuoidea
- Family: Noctuidae
- Genus: Perigrapha
- Species: P. munda

Binomial name
- Perigrapha munda (Denis & Schiffermüller, 1775)

Synonyms
- Noctua munda Denis & Schiffermüller, 1775; Anorthoa munda (Denis & Schiffermüller, 1775); Orthosia munda (Denis & Schiffermüller, 1775)

= Perigrapha munda =

Species of moth

Perigrapha munda, the twin-spotted Quaker, is a species of moth of the family Noctuidae. The wings are gray, with two closely approximate and very conspicuous dark spots on the disc of the fore wings. a small dark apical mark at the costal edge and a discal spot on the fuscous hindwings. It is found in Palearctic realm (all Europe (absent only in the North and in the South), Russia, and Asia as far east as Japan).

The wingspan is 38–44 mm. The moth flies from March to May depending on the location.

The larvae feed on oak, willow, Populus tremula, Fraxinus excelsior, Acer campestre, Humulus lupulus and honeysuckle.

The nectar-feeding adults visit sallow blossom.

== Variation ==
Perigrapha munda is variable both in colour and markings and there are many named forms. The forewing colouration is from light ochreous brown through to dark ochreous. The stigmata are not well defined and the subterminal line is often faint and reduced to two black median dots. The crosslines are not always well defined in darker forms. The discal spot in the hindwings area is not always clearly defined. There is an isolated subspecies on Taiwan

== Habitat ==
Wooded places- deciduous forests, bushy hedgerows and in gardens and parkland. In the Alps up to a height of maximum 1200 meters.

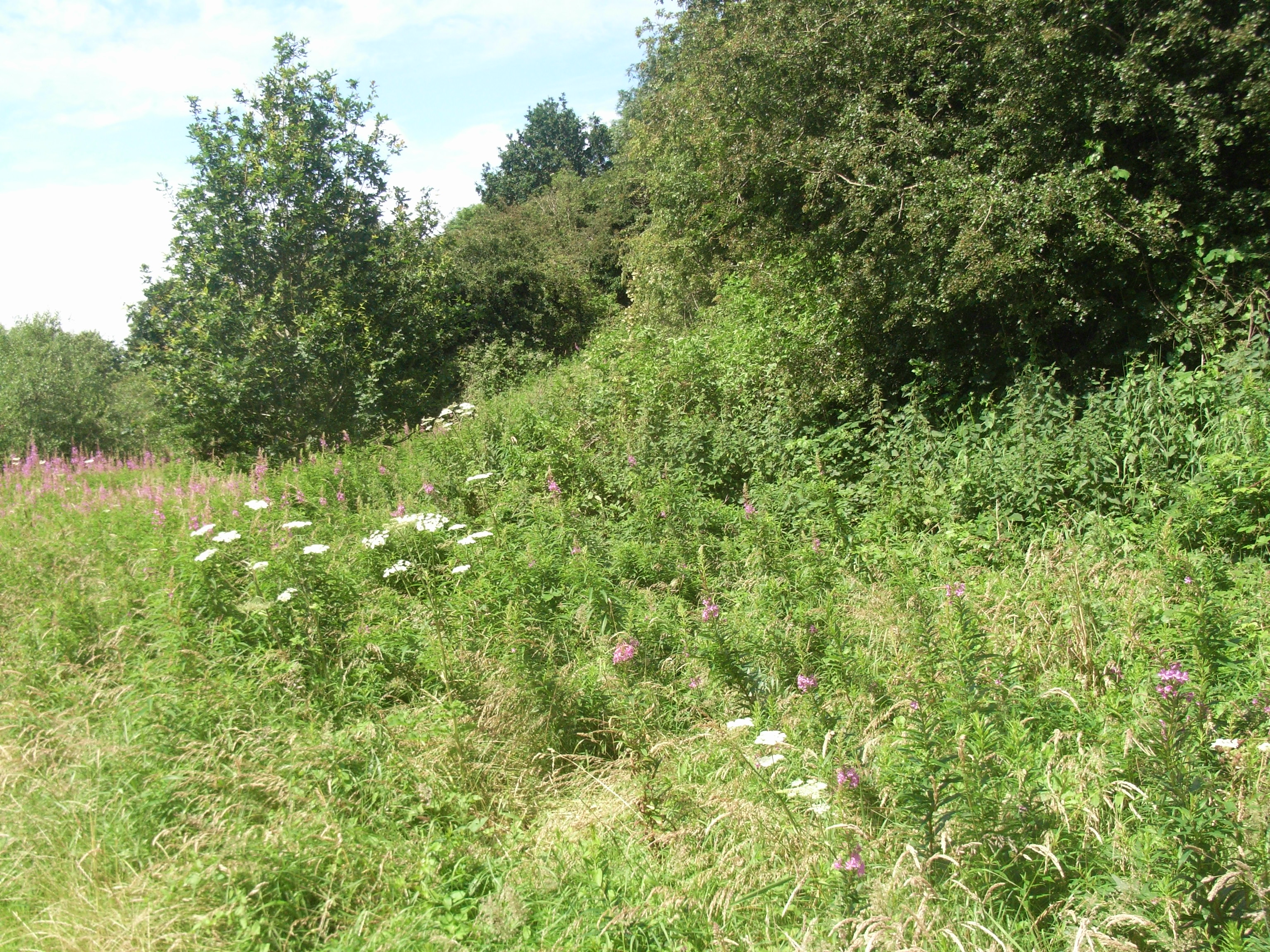
habitat

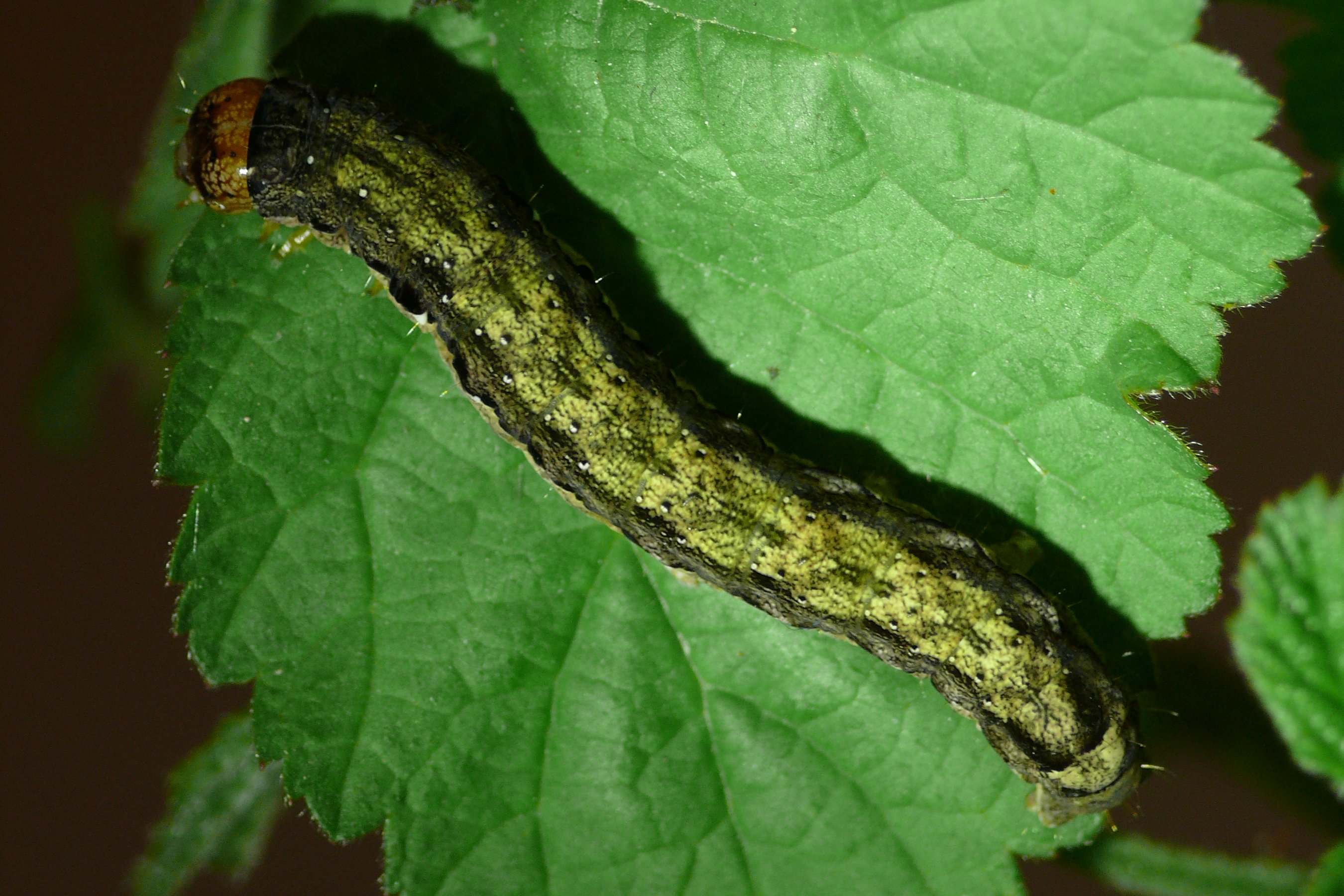
larva

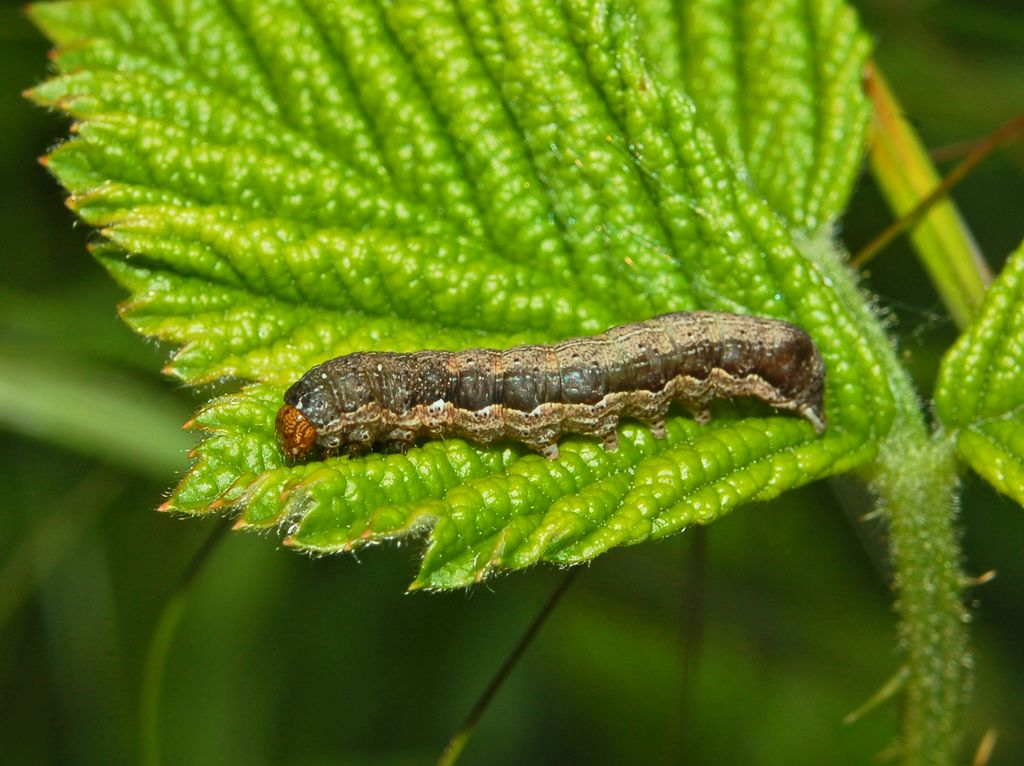
larva, lateral view

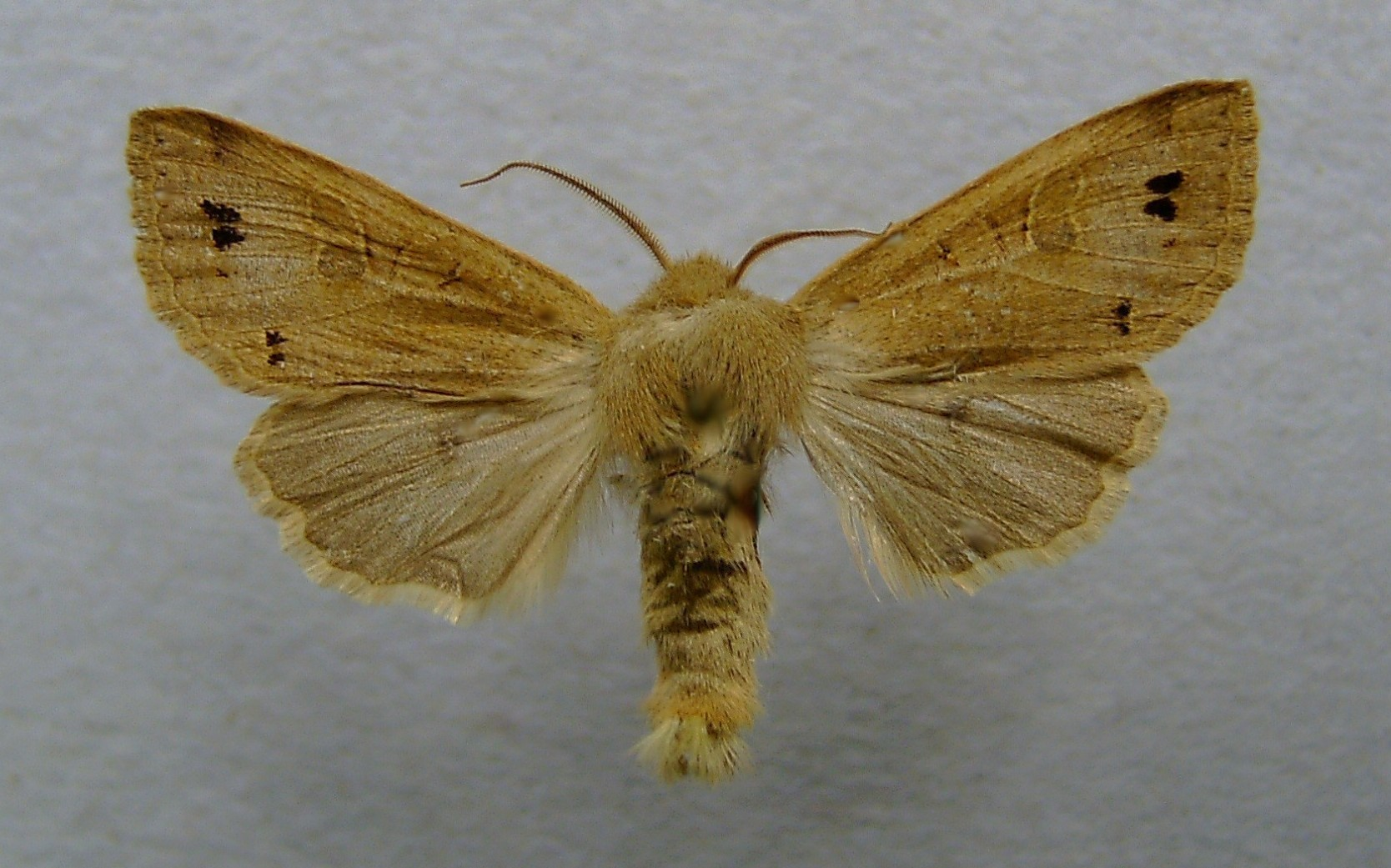
