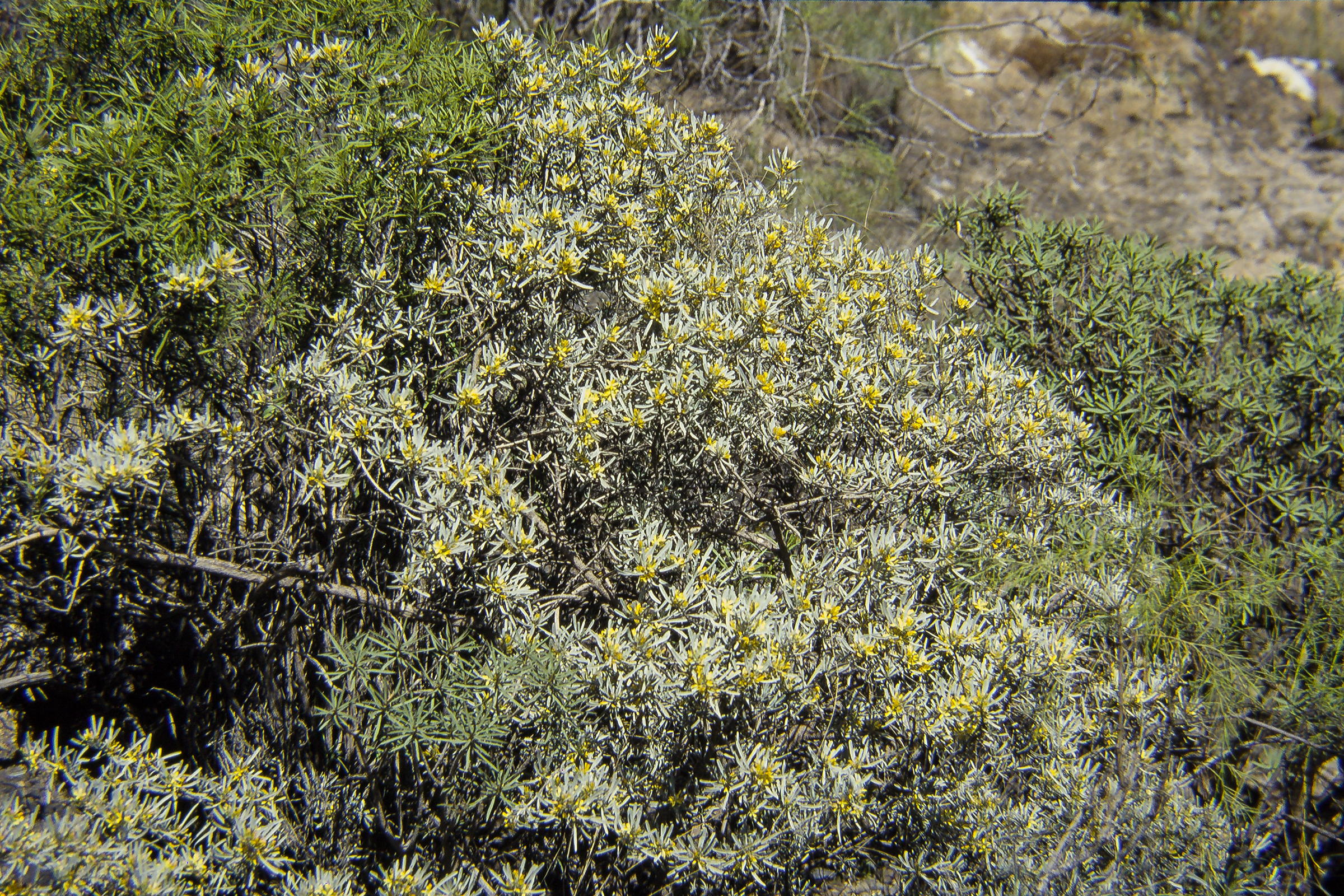
- In habitat, Barranco del Infierno, Tenerife

Scientific classification
- Kingdom: Plantae
- Clade: Tracheophytes
- Clade: Angiosperms
- Clade: Eudicots
- Clade: Rosids
- Order: Sapindales
- Family: Rutaceae
- Genus: Cneorum
- Species: C. pulverulentum

Binomial name
- Cneorum pulverulentum Vent.

= Cneorum pulverulentum =

Species of flowering plant

Cneorum pulverulentum is a species of flowering plant in the family Rutaceae, native to the Canary Islands. It was first described by Étienne Ventenat.

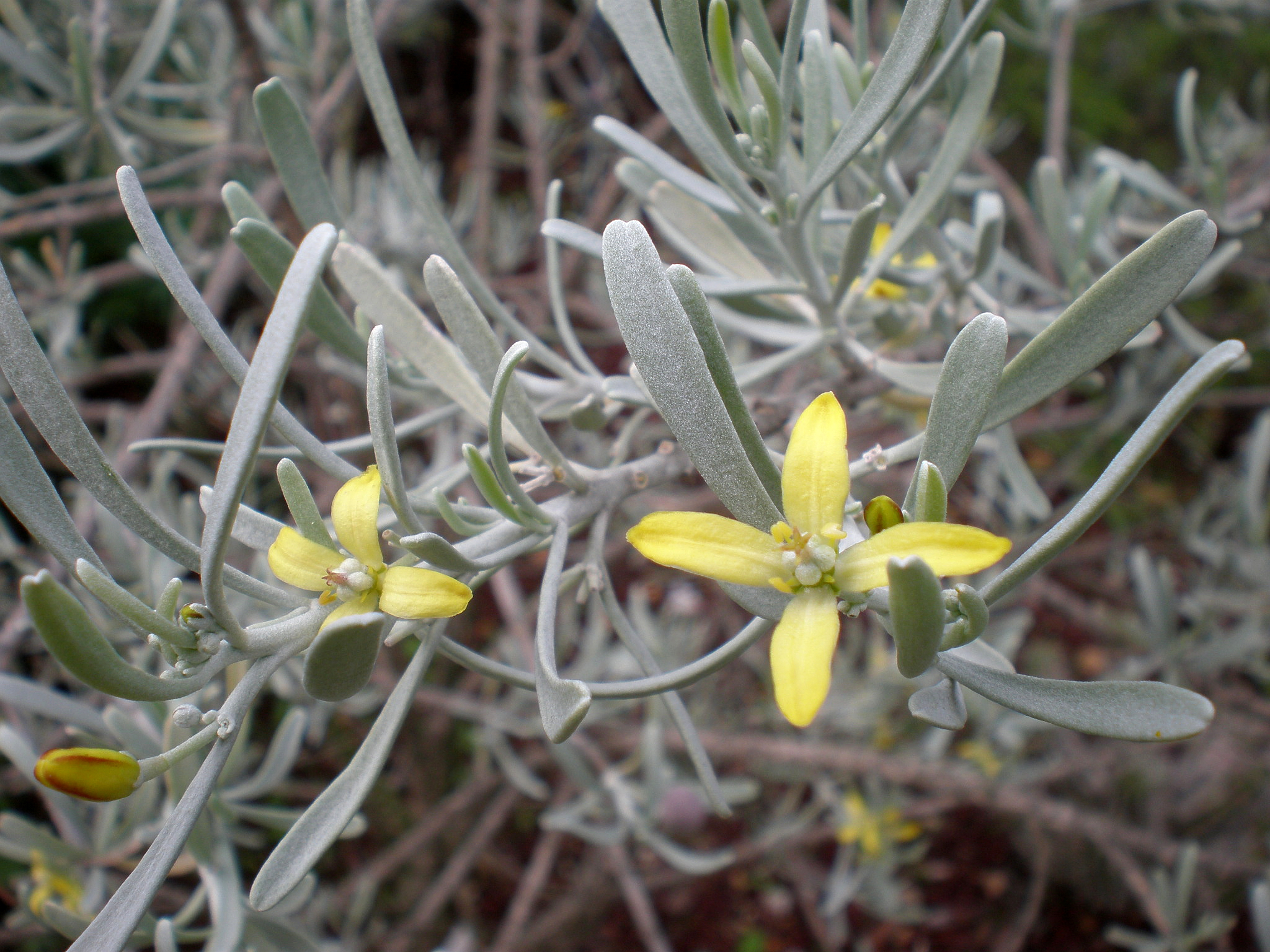
Flowers

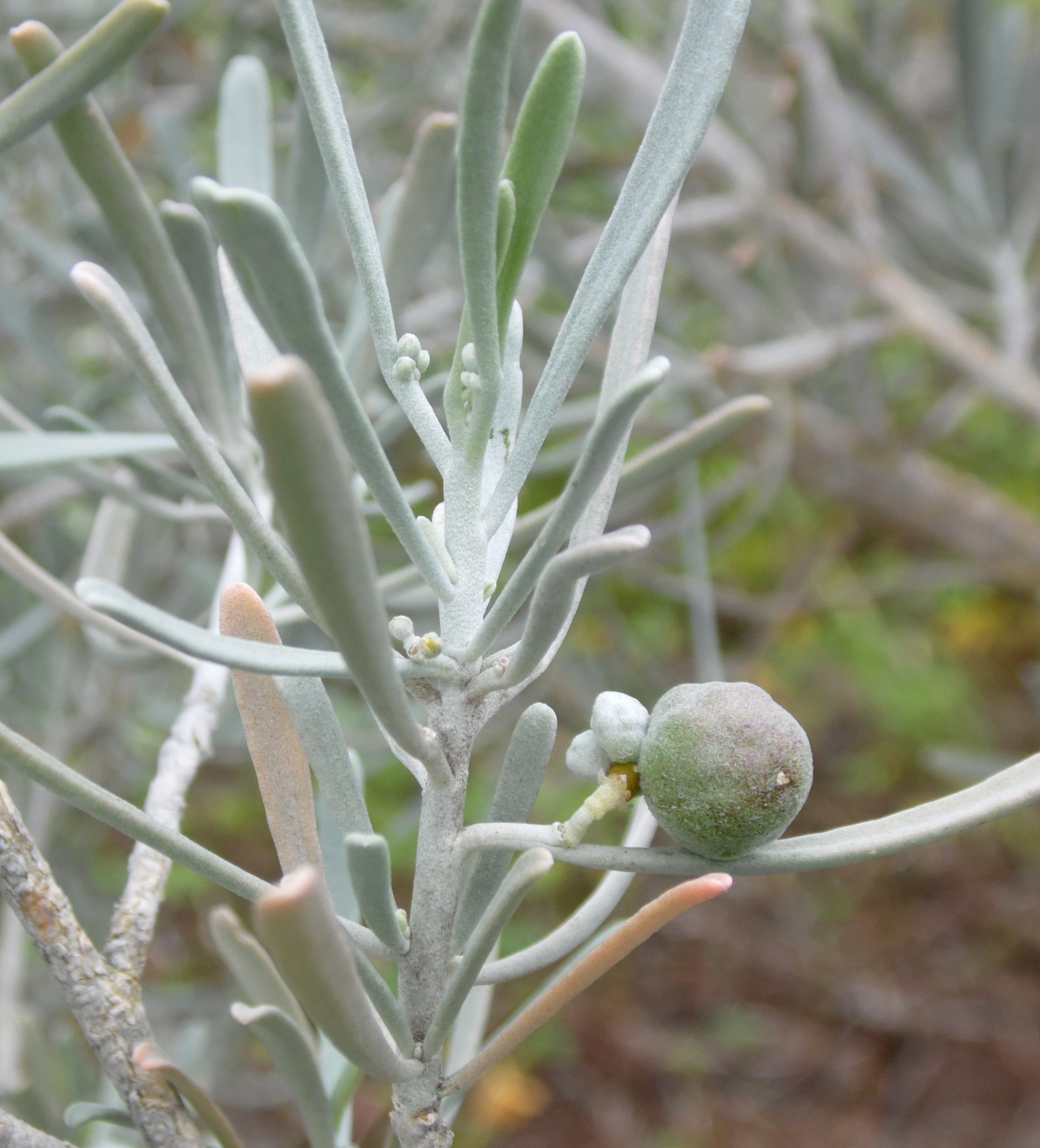
Fruit
