= Spathelia glabrescens =

Conservation status
- Near Threatened (IUCN 2.3)

Scientific classification
- Kingdom: Plantae
- Clade: Tracheophytes
- Clade: Angiosperms
- Clade: Eudicots
- Clade: Rosids
- Order: Sapindales
- Family: Rutaceae
- Genus: Spathelia
- Species: S. glabrescens

Binomial name
- Spathelia glabrescens Planch.

Species of plant

Spathelia glabrescens is a species of plant in the family Rutaceae. It is endemic to Jamaica.
