= Sohnreyia =

Scientific classification
- Kingdom: Plantae
- Clade: Tracheophytes
- Clade: Angiosperms
- Clade: Eudicots
- Clade: Rosids
- Order: Sapindales
- Family: Rutaceae
- Subfamily: Cneoroideae
- Genus: Sohnreyia; K.Krause

Species
- See text.

Genus of flowering plants

Sohnreyia is a genus of five species of flowering plants in the family Rutaceae, native to South America (within Bolivia, Brazil, Colombia, Peru and Venezuela). They are all "palmoids" or Corner Model Trees (named after E. J. H. Corner, the first to describe this architectural growth form). As such they most commonly consist of a single, pachycaul trunk topped by a rosette of very large, pinnate leaves, and are usually monocarpic. The genus was first described by Kurt Krause in 1914. The genus name of Sohnreyia is in honour of Heinrich Sohnrey (1859–1948), a German teacher and writer.

== Species ==
As of June 2025, Plants of the World Online accept the following species:

- Sohnreyia excelsa K.Krause
- Sohnreyia giraldoana (Parra-Os.) Appelhans & Kessler
- Sohnreyia maigualidensis J.R.Grande & Kallunki
- Sohnreyia terminalioides (A.H.Gentry) Appelhans & Kessler
- Sohnreyia ulei (Engl. ex Harms) Appelhans & Kessler
