= Spathelia coccinea =

Conservation status
- Critically Endangered (IUCN 2.3)

Scientific classification
- Kingdom: Plantae
- Clade: Tracheophytes
- Clade: Angiosperms
- Clade: Eudicots
- Clade: Rosids
- Order: Sapindales
- Family: Rutaceae
- Genus: Spathelia
- Species: S. coccinea

Binomial name
- Spathelia coccinea Proctor

Species of plant

Spathelia coccinea is a species of plant in the family Rutaceae. It is endemic to Jamaica. It is threatened by habitat loss.
