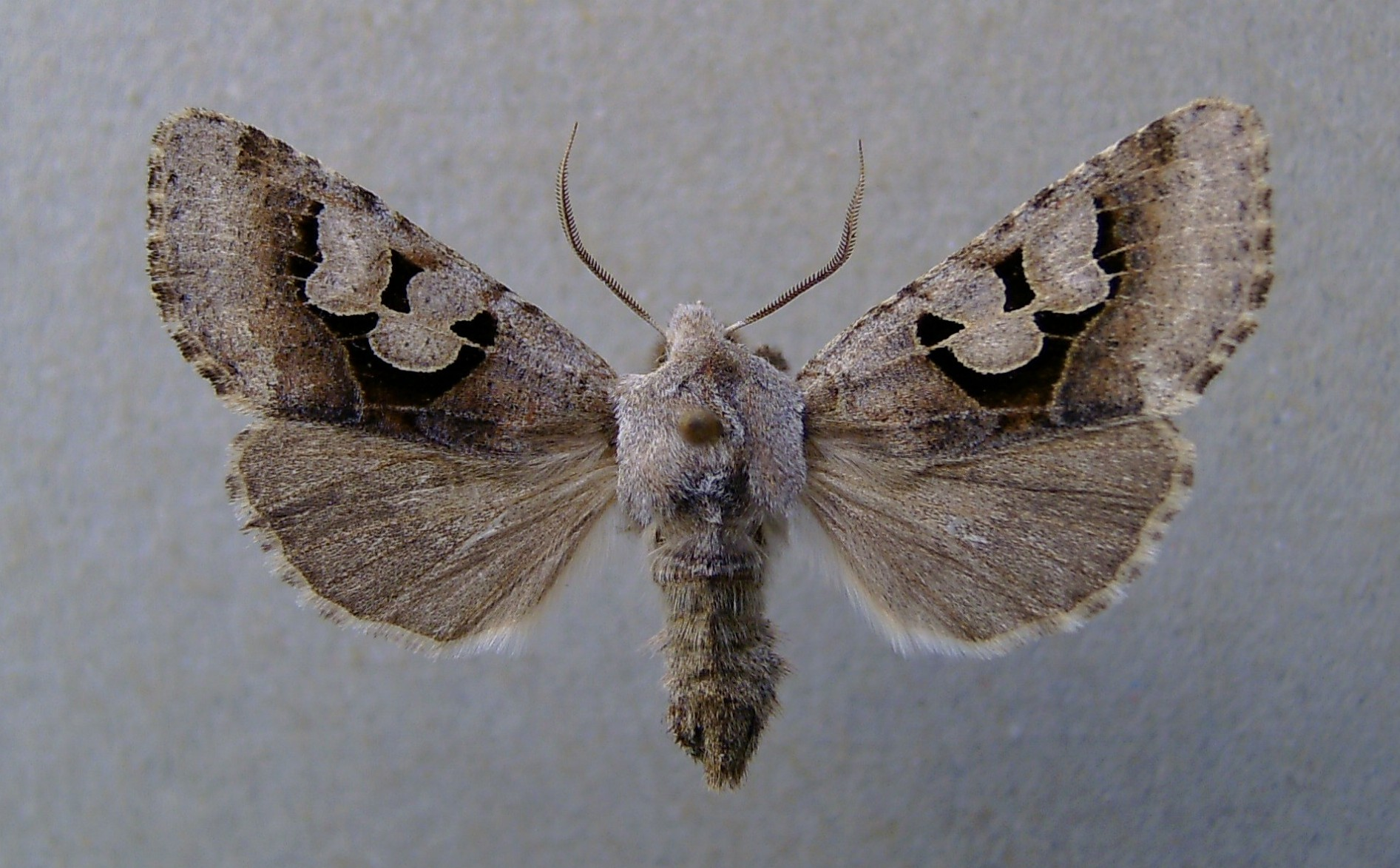
- Perigrapha i-cinctum

Scientific classification
- Kingdom: Animalia
- Phylum: Arthropoda
- Clade: Pancrustacea
- Class: Insecta
- Order: Lepidoptera
- Superfamily: Noctuoidea
- Family: Noctuidae
- Genus: Perigrapha; Lederer, 1857

= Perigrapha (moth) =

Genus of moths

Perigrapha is a genus of moths of the family Noctuidae.

== Species ==
- Perigrapha albilinea Draudt, 1950
- Perigrapha annaus Varga & Ronkay, 1991
- Perigrapha asymmetrica Varga, 1990
- Perigrapha brunnea
- Perigrapha centralasiae Bartel, 1906
- Perigrapha cilissa Püngeler, 1917
- Perigrapha cincta
- Perigrapha circumducta Lederer, 1855
- Perigrapha duktana Draudt, 1934
- Perigrapha extincta Kononenko, 1989
- Perigrapha flora Hreblay, 1996
- Perigrapha heidi Hreblay, 1996
- Perigrapha hoenei Püngeler, 1914
- Perigrapha i-cinctum Denis & Schiffermüller, 1775
- Perigrapha irkuta
- Perigrapha kofka
- Perigrapha mithras Wiltshire, 1941
- Perigrapha munda Denis & Schiffermüller, 1775
- Perigrapha mundoides Boursin, 1940
- Perigrapha nigrocincta Hreblay & Ronkay, 1997
- Perigrapha nyctotimia Boursin, 1969
- Perigrapha pallescens
- Perigrapha pallida
- Perigrapha pamiricola Hreblay & Kononenko, 1995
- Perigrapha plumbeata
- Perigrapha rorida Frivaldszky, 1835
- Perigrapha scriptobella Hreblay, 1996
- Perigrapha sellingi Fibiger, Hacker & Moberg, 1996
- Perigrapha slovenica
- Perigrapha sugitanii
- Perigrapha triangulifera
- Perigrapha uniformis Draudt, 1950
- Perigrapha unimaculata
- Perigrapha wimmeri Hacker, 1996
- Perigrapha wolfi Hacker, 1988
- Perigrapha yoshimotoi
