= Bottegoa insignis =

Conservation status
- Near Threatened (IUCN 2.3)

Scientific classification
- Kingdom: Plantae
- Clade: Tracheophytes
- Clade: Angiosperms
- Clade: Eudicots
- Clade: Rosids
- Order: Sapindales
- Family: Rutaceae
- Genus: Bottegoa
- Species: B. insignis

Binomial name
- Bottegoa insignis Chiov.

Species of flowering plant

Bottegoa insignis is a species of plant in the family Rutaceae. It is found in Ethiopia, Kenya, and Somalia. It is threatened by habitat loss.
