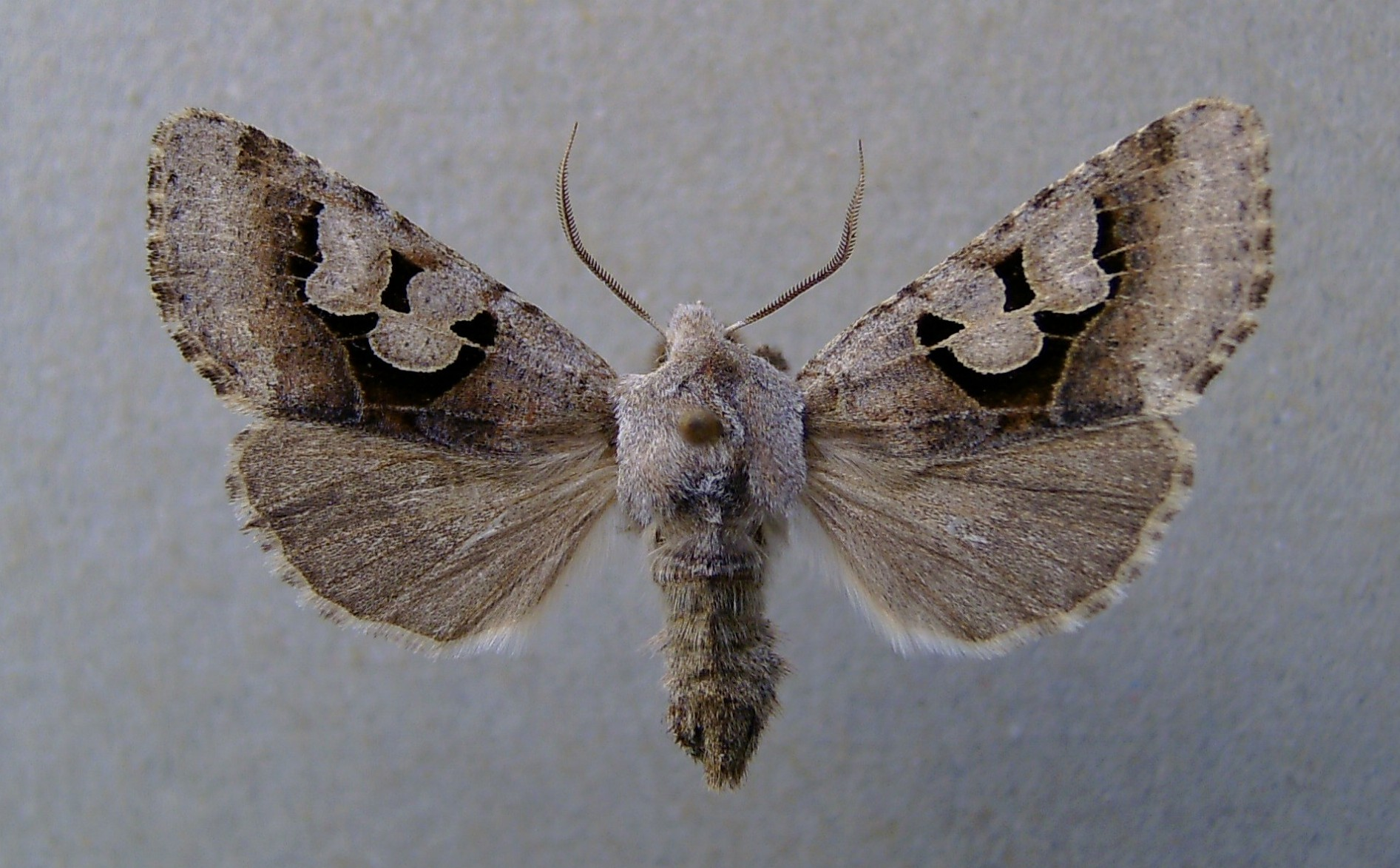

Scientific classification
- Domain: Eukaryota
- Kingdom: Animalia
- Phylum: Arthropoda
- Class: Insecta
- Order: Lepidoptera
- Superfamily: Noctuoidea
- Family: Noctuidae
- Genus: Perigrapha
- Species: P. i-cinctum

Binomial name
- Perigrapha i-cinctum (Denis & Schiffermüller, 1775)

Synonyms
- Noctua i-cinctum Denis & Schiffermüller, 1775; Noctua cincta Fabricius, 1787

= Perigrapha i-cinctum =

Species of moth

Perigrapha i-cinctum is a moth of the family Noctuidae. It is found from southern and south-eastern Europe to Asia Minor.

The wingspan is 37–44 mm. Adults are on wing from March to April.

The larvae feed on the leaves of various plants, including Plantago, Rumex, Fragaria, Stellaria, Lamium, Centaurea, Pulsatilla and Taraxacum species. Young larvae mine while older larvae feed within the rhizome, where pupation also takes place. Larvae can be found from May to June. The species overwinters as a pupa in the soil.

== Subspecies ==
- Perigrapha i-cinctum i-cinctum (in the Pannonian Basin)
- Perigrapha i-cinctum gepida Hreblay, 1996 (France and Italy)
- Perigrapha i-cinctum slovenica Michielie, 1966 (Slovenia and the Balkan Peninsula)
- Perigrapha i-cinctum hethitica Hacker, 1993 (Turkey)
