= Paliurus orientalis =

Conservation status
- Least Concern (IUCN 3.1)

Scientific classification
- Kingdom: Plantae
- Clade: Tracheophytes
- Clade: Angiosperms
- Clade: Eudicots
- Clade: Rosids
- Order: Rosales
- Family: Rhamnaceae
- Genus: Paliurus
- Species: P. orientalis

Binomial name
- Paliurus orientalis (Franch.) Hemsl. (1894)

Synonyms
- Paliurus australis var. orientalis Franch.; Paliurus sinicus C.K.Schneid.

Species of flowering plant

Paliurus orientalis is a species of flowering plant in genus Paliurus. It is a shrub or tree native to Yunnan and southwestern Sichuan provinces in south-central China. It can grow up to 12 m (39 ft) in size. It grows in montane subtropical moist forests from 900 to 2,000 metres elevation.
