= Spathelia =

Scientific classification
- Kingdom: Plantae
- Clade: Embryophytes
- Clade: Tracheophytes
- Clade: Angiosperms
- Clade: Eudicots
- Clade: Rosids
- Order: Sapindales
- Family: Rutaceae
- Subfamily: Cneoroideae
- Genus: Spathelia; L.

Synonyms
- Diomma Engl. ex Harms; Spathalea L.; Spathe P.Browne

Genus of plants

Spathelia is a genus in the plant family Rutaceae, subfamily Cneoroideae. Species records are from central America and the Caribbean.

== Species ==
Plants of the World Online currently includes:

1. Spathelia bahamensis Vict.
2. Spathelia belizensis Acev.-Rodr. & S.W.Brewer
3. Spathelia brittonii P.Wilson
4. Spathelia coccinea Proctor
5. Spathelia cubensis P.Wilson
6. Spathelia glabrescens Planch.
7. Spathelia simplex L. - type species
8. Spathelia splendens Urb.
9. Spathelia subintegra Vict.
10. Spathelia vernicosa Planch.
11. Spathelia wrightii Vict.
