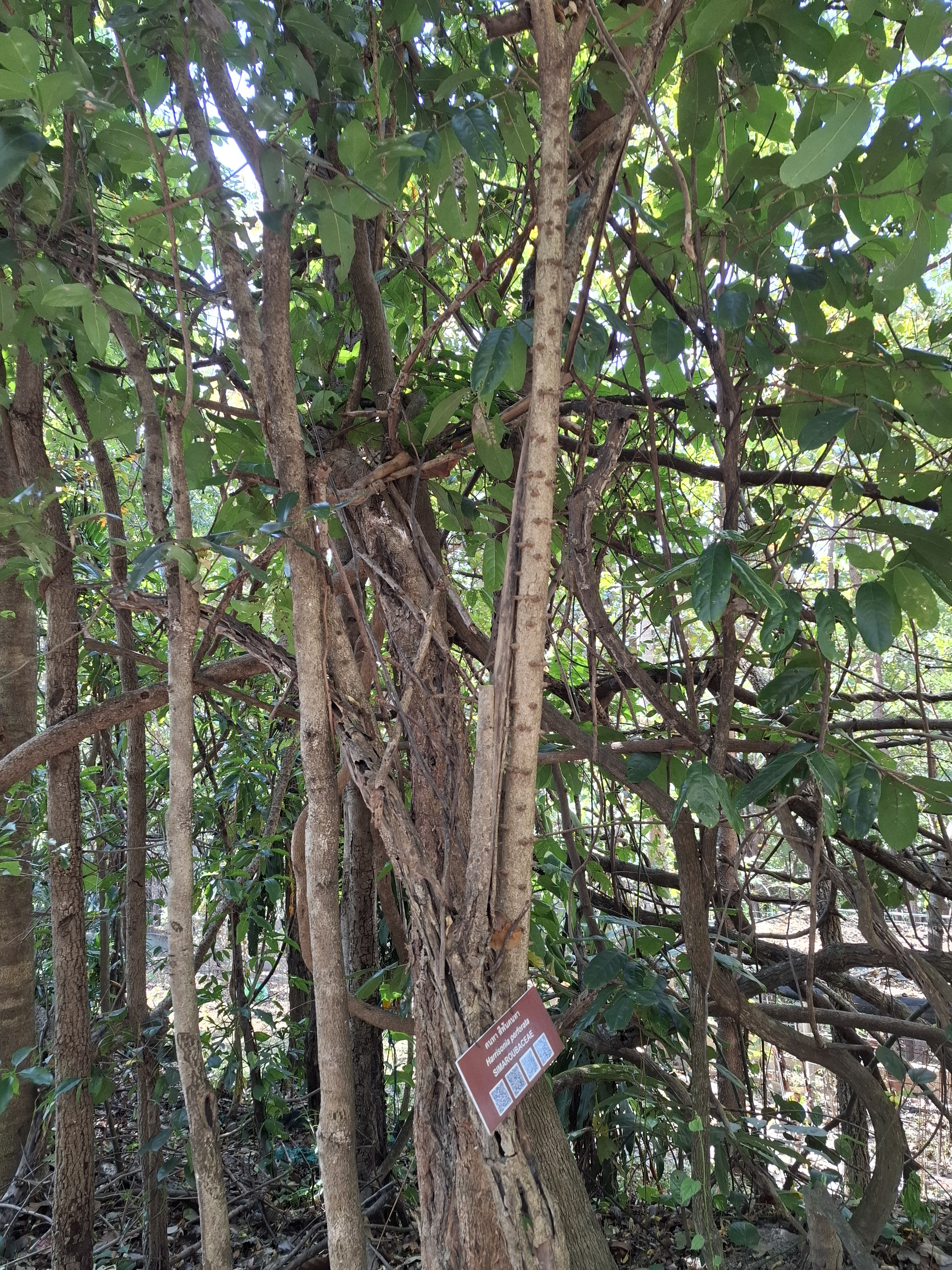

Conservation status
- Least Concern (IUCN 3.1)

Scientific classification
- Kingdom: Plantae
- Clade: Tracheophytes
- Clade: Angiosperms
- Clade: Eudicots
- Clade: Rosids
- Order: Sapindales
- Family: Rutaceae
- Genus: Harrisonia
- Species: H. perforata

Binomial name
- Harrisonia perforata (Blanco) Merr.

Synonyms
- Paliurus perforatus Blanco; Paliurus dubius Blanco; Limonia pubescens Wall. Lasiolepis paucijuga Benn. Lasiolepis multijuga Benn. Lasiolepis bennetii Planch. Harrisonia paucijuga Oliv. Harrisonia citrinaecarpa Elmer; Harrisonia bennetii A. W. Benn. Feroniella pubescens Tanaka; Fagara piperita Blanco; Ebelingia paucijuga Kuntze; Anisifolium pubescens Kuntze

= Harrisonia perforata =

Species of plant in the family Rutaceae

Harrisonia perforata is a species of liana in the family Rutaceae. Its recorded distribution includes: Andaman Islands, Nicobar Islands, Bangladesh, Myanmar, Indo-China, Java and Lesser Sunda Islands, but no subspecies are listed in the Catalogue of Life.
