= Sohnreyia excelsa =

Scientific classification
- Kingdom: Plantae
- Clade: Tracheophytes
- Clade: Angiosperms
- Clade: Eudicots
- Clade: Rosids
- Order: Sapindales
- Family: Rutaceae
- Genus: Sohnreyia
- Species: S. excelsa

Binomial name
- Sohnreyia excelsa K.Krause

Synonyms
- Spathelia excelsa (K.Krause) R.S.Cowan & Brizicky

Tree native to the Amazon Basin

Sohnreyia excelsa, synonym Spathelia excelsa, commonly called the maypole tree, is one of a genus of palmoid trees, or corner model trees, (architecturally palm-like in gross form) belonging to the citrus, or rue family (Rutaceae). It is native to the rainforests of the Amazon basin, and was discovered in 1911 by botanical explorer Ernst H. G. Ule. It is a monocarpic tree growing to 10–20 m (33–66 ft) tall, with the flowers produced in an immense thyrse 3 m (9.8 ft) high and about 3.7 m (12 ft) wide; the second largest inflorescence of any dicot (after Harmsiopanax ingens). The palmlike leaves are once-pinnate and up to 2.5 m (8 ft 2.4 in) long, with 30–54 leaflets.
