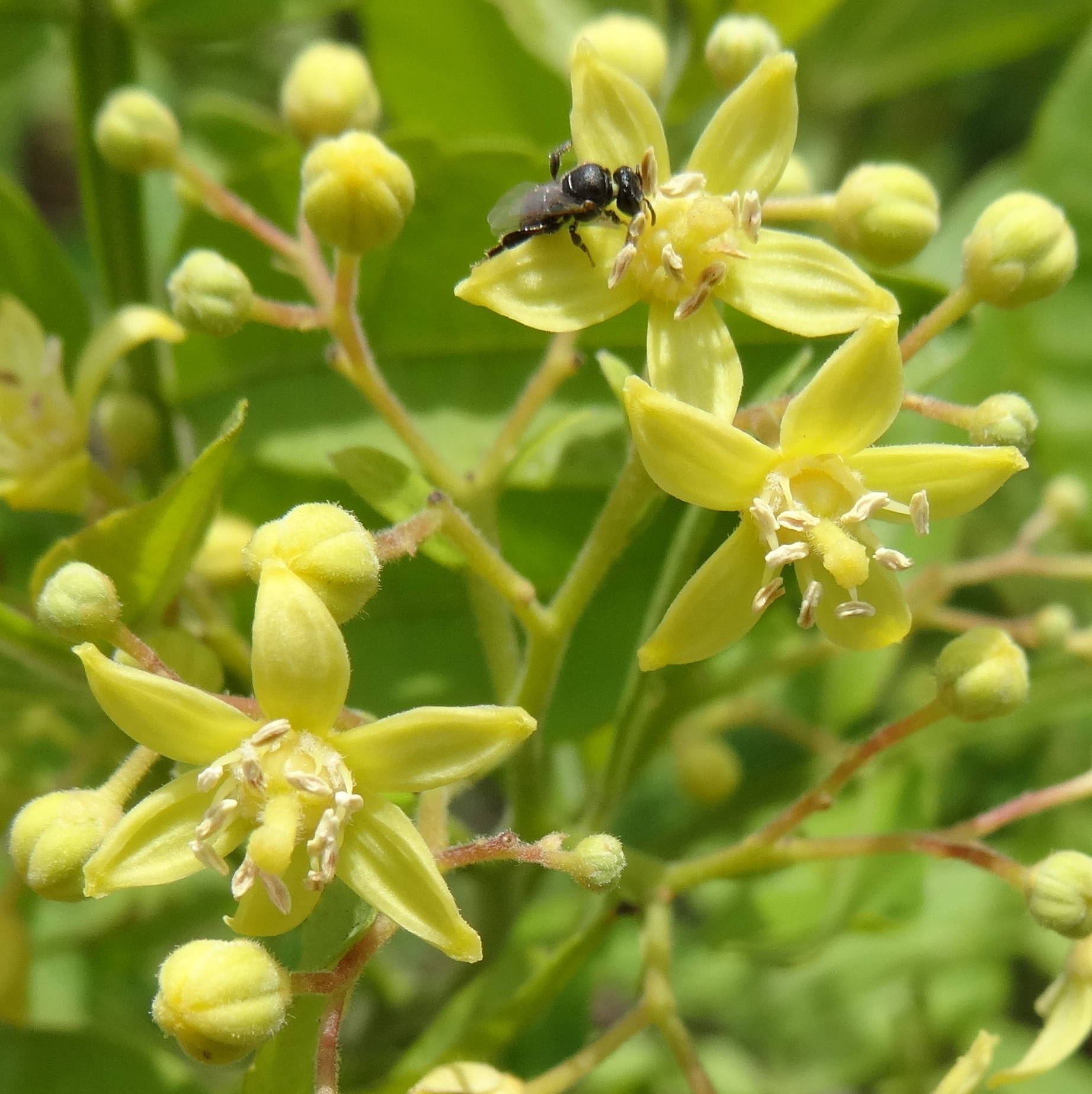
- Harrisonia abyssinica

Scientific classification
- Kingdom: Plantae
- Clade: Tracheophytes
- Clade: Angiosperms
- Clade: Eudicots
- Clade: Rosids
- Order: Sapindales
- Family: Rutaceae
- Subfamily: Cneoroideae
- Genus: Harrisonia; R.Br. ex A.Juss.

Synonyms
- Ebelingia Rchb.; Lasiolepis Benn.

= Harrisonia =

Genus of flowering plants

Harrisonia is a small genus of flowering plants in the subfamily Cneoroideae of the Rutaceae (citrus family). Older taxonomic treatments have placed this genus in the Simaroubaceae.

== Species ==
Plants of the World Online currently includes:

1. Harrisonia abyssinica Oliv. - Africa
2. Harrisonia brownii A.Juss. - type species with a discontinuous range from the Andaman Islands to Malesia and New Guinea
3. Harrisonia perforata (Blanco) Merr. - China and Indochina
