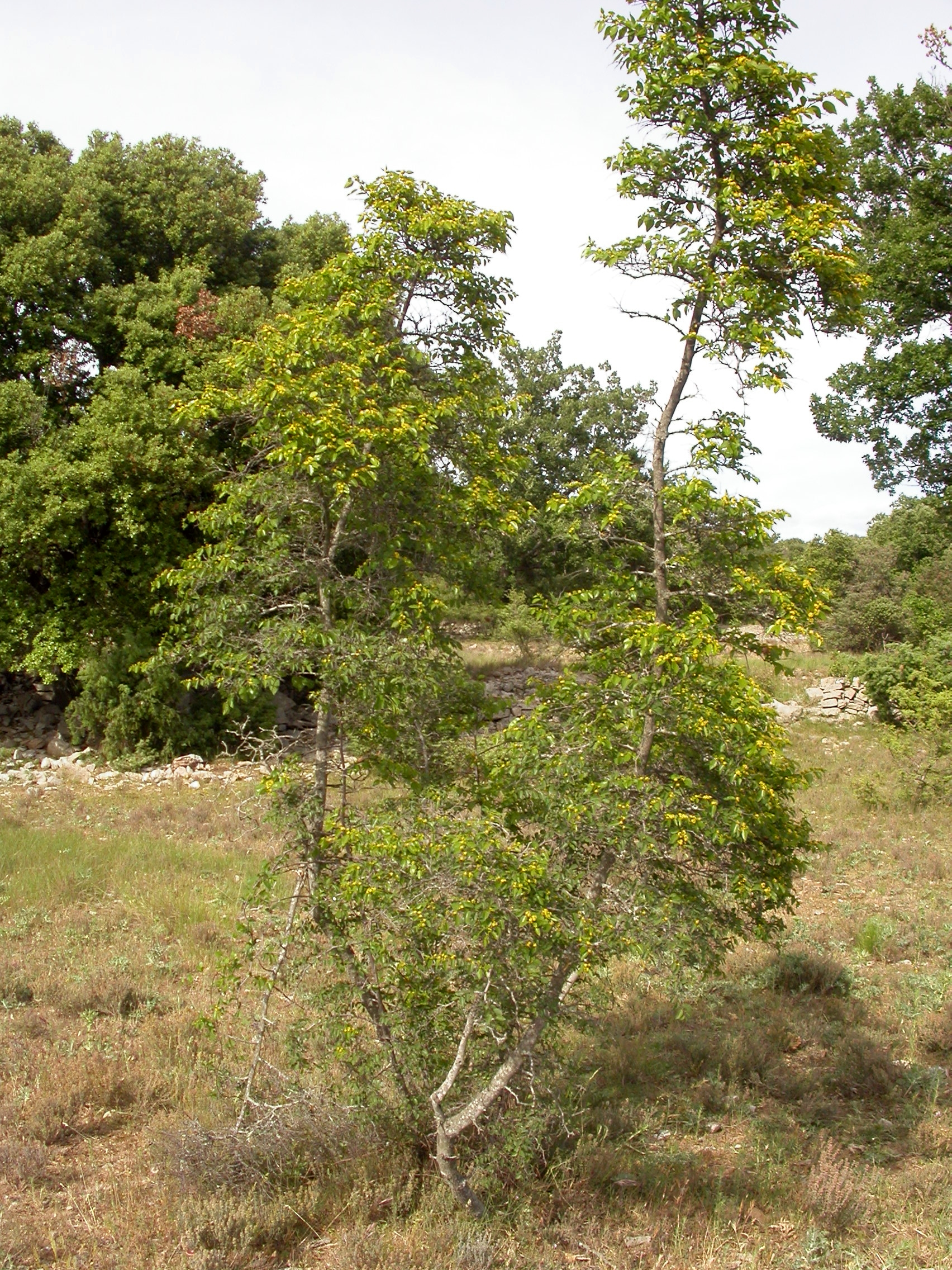
- Jerusalem thorn (Paliurus spina-christi)

Scientific classification
- Kingdom: Plantae
- Clade: Tracheophytes
- Clade: Angiosperms
- Clade: Eudicots
- Clade: Rosids
- Order: Rosales
- Family: Rhamnaceae
- Genus: Paliurus
- Species: P. spina-christi

Binomial name
- Paliurus spina-christi Mill.

Synonyms
- Paliurus aculeatus Lam.; Paliurus australis Gaertn.; Rhamnus paliurus L.; Ziziphus spina-christi (Mill.) Georgi

= Paliurus spina-christi =

Species of shrub

Paliurus spina-christi, commonly known as Jerusalem thorn, garland thorn, Christ's thorn, or crown of thorns, is a species of Paliurus native to the Mediterranean region, Southwest Asia and Central Asia, from Spain and southern France east to Afghanistan and Tajikistan.

== Description ==
It is a deciduous shrub or small tree growing to 3–4 m tall. The shoots are zig-zagged, with a leaf and two stipular spines (one straight, one curved) on the outside of each kink. The leaves are oval, 2–5 cm long and 1–4 cm broad, glossy green, with an entire margin. The fruit is a dry woody nutlet centred in a circular wing 2–3.5 cm in diameter.

== Etymology ==
As suggested by the Latin name, the spiny branches of this shrub were thought to be used to make the crown of thorns placed on Jesus' head before his crucifixion. Ziziphus spina-christi, the Christ's thorn jujube, is also identified as being used for the crown of thorns.

== Uses ==
It is viewed as an ornamental curiosity, grown for its odd-looking discus-like fruit, and is cultivated in some areas outside its native range, including western Europe north to Great Britain.

It is locally naturalised in northwestern Africa, northern India, Hungary, and in the United States in Texas.

== Gallery ==
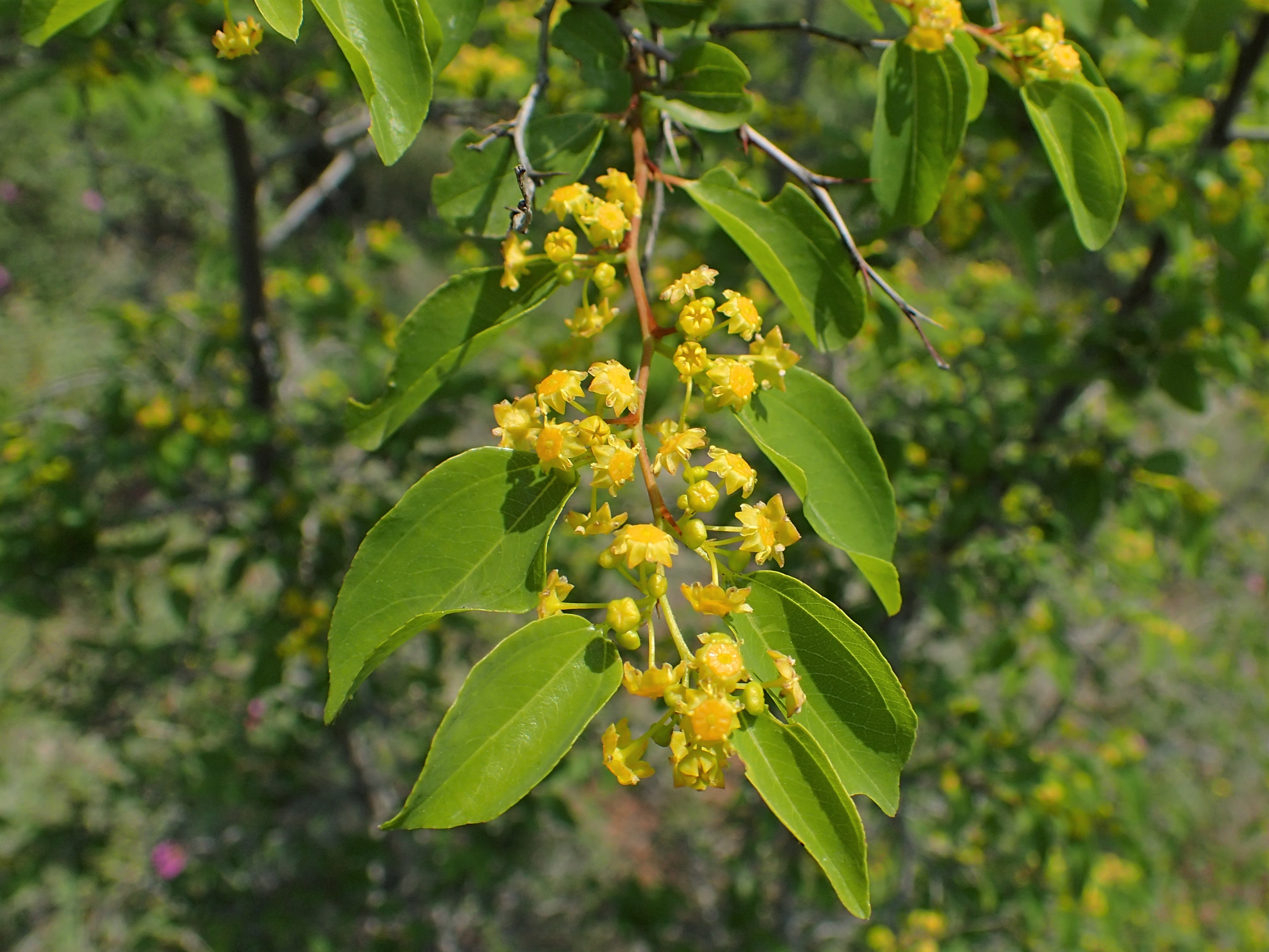
Foliage and flowers, in northern Greece

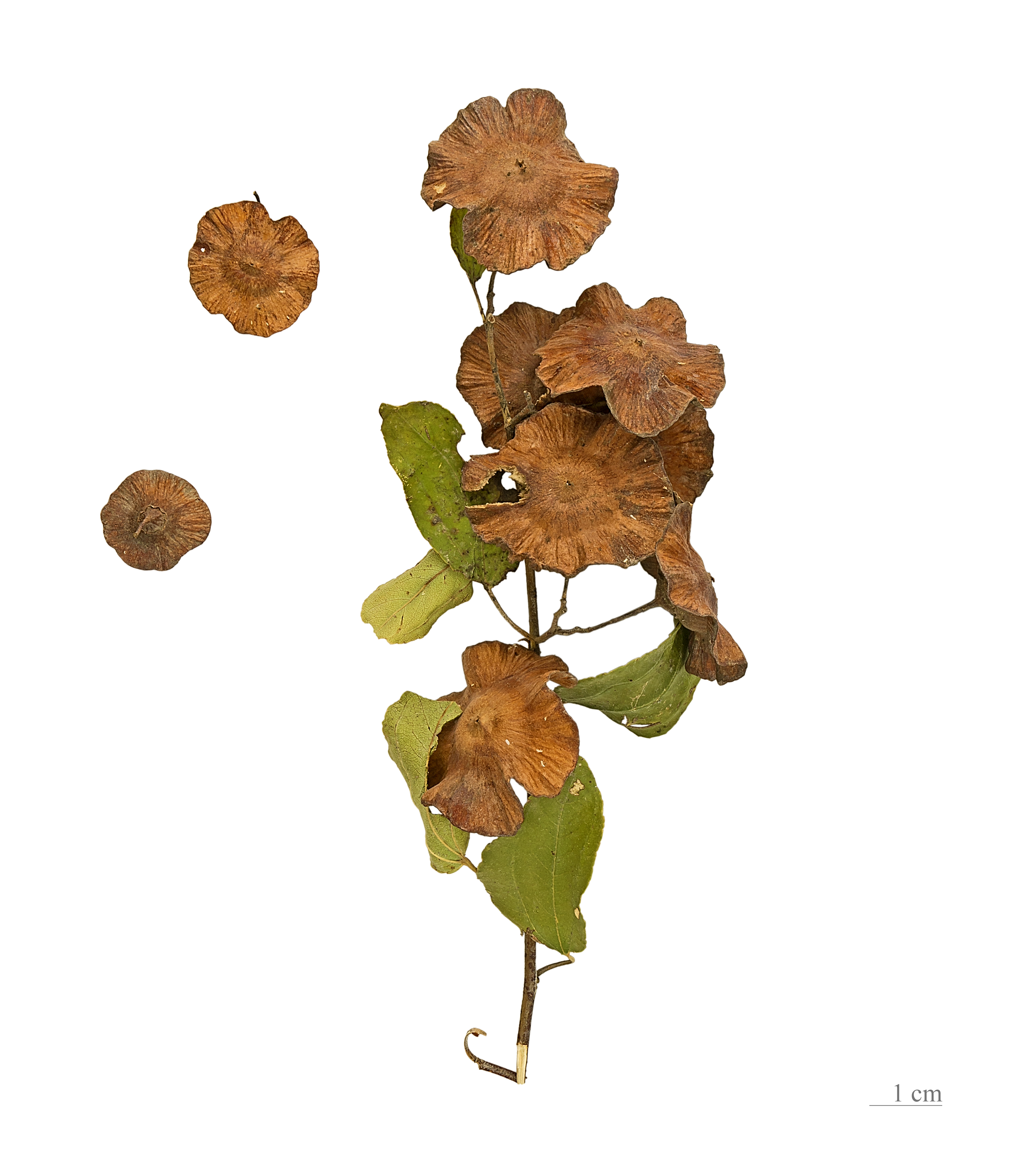
Fruit and seeds of Paliurus spina-christi

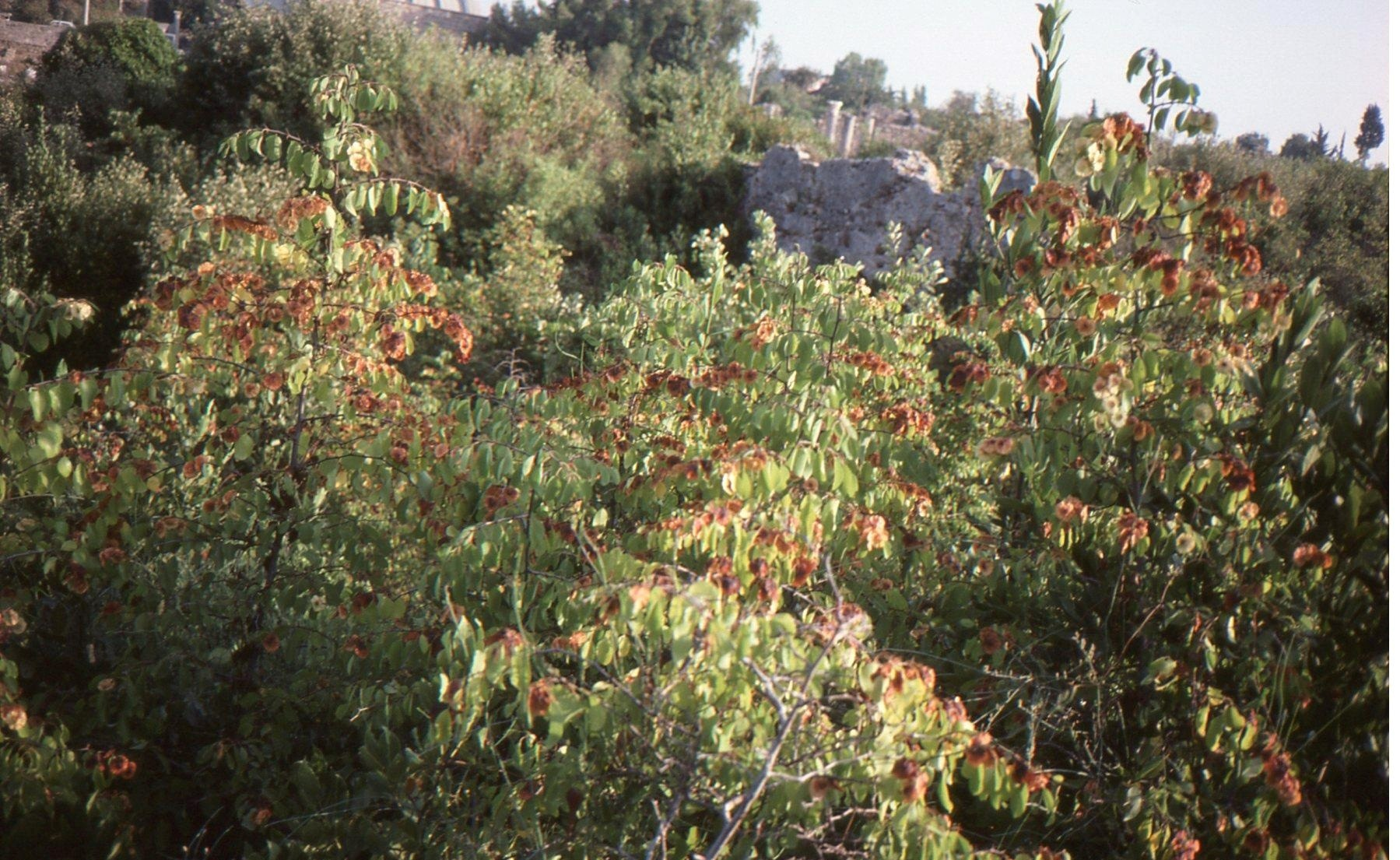
Paliurus spina-christi, Christ's thorn shrub bearing fruit among the ruins of Side, Turkey.

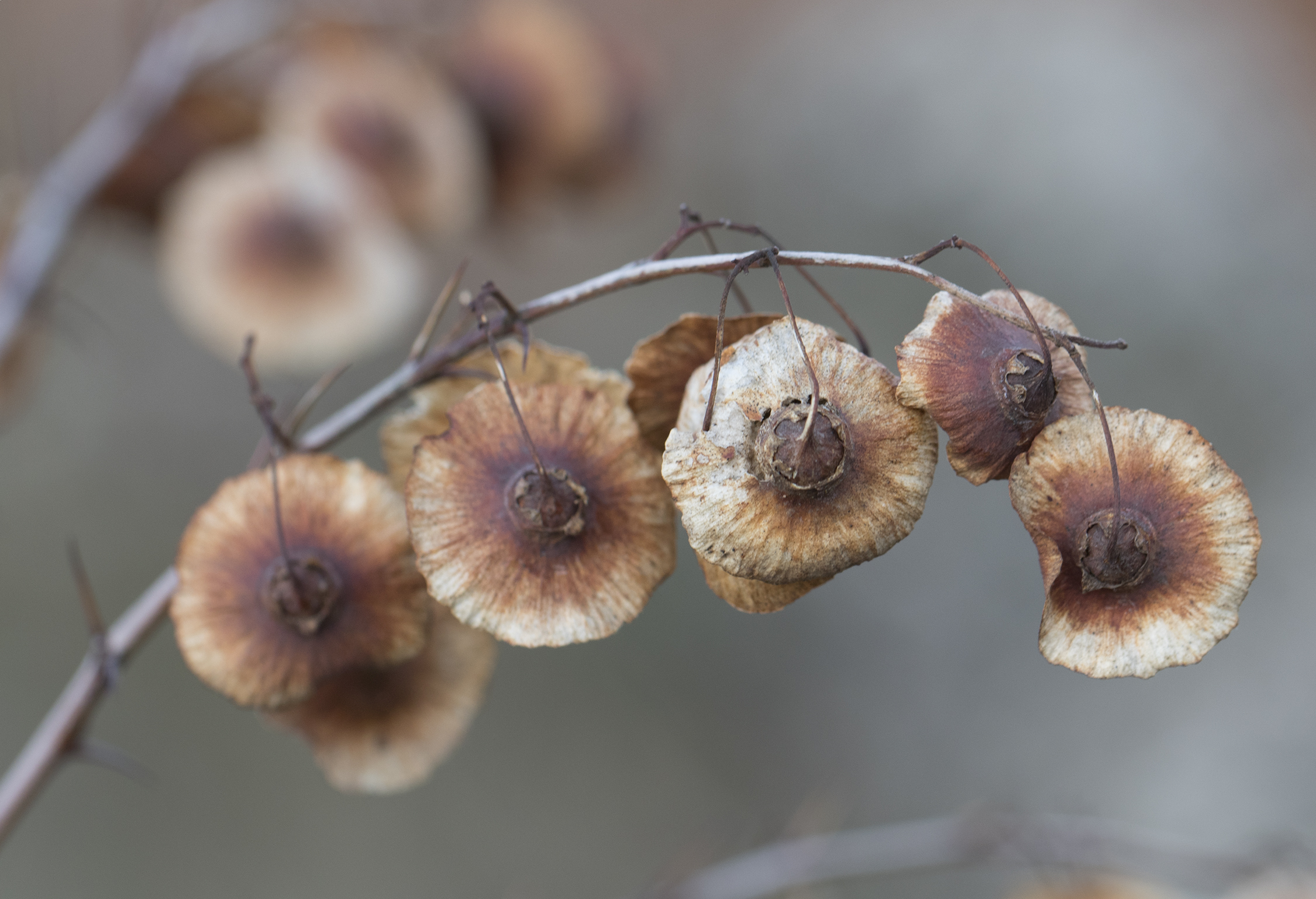
Dry fruit, at Gaziantep, Turkey
