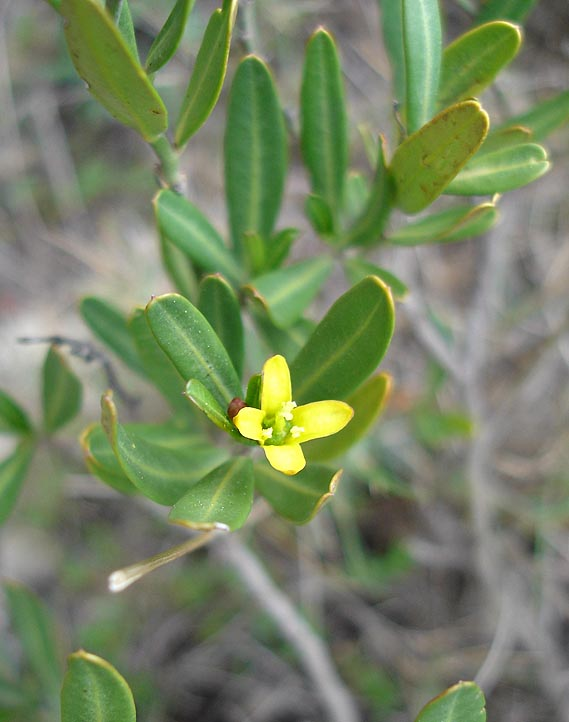
- Spurge olive (Cneorum tricoccon)

Scientific classification
- Kingdom: Plantae
- Clade: Embryophytes
- Clade: Tracheophytes
- Clade: Spermatophytes
- Clade: Angiosperms
- Clade: Eudicots
- Clade: Rosids
- Order: Sapindales
- Family: Rutaceae
- Subfamily: Cneoroideae
- Genus: Cneorum; L.

Species
- See text.

Synonyms
- Chamaelea Duhamel; Cubincola Urb.; Neochamaelea (Engl.) Erdtman

= Cneorum =

Genus of plants

Cneorum is a genus of flowering plants in the rue or citrus family Rutaceae. The two species are native to Europe and the Canary Islands.

== Etymology ==
The name is from New Latin with Greek origins in the word kneōron (κνέωρον), the name for a plant, possibly spurge flax (Daphne gnidium).

== Species ==
As of January 2018, Plants of the World Online accepted the following two species:

- Cneorum pulverulentum Vent.
- Cneorum tricoccon L.

== See also ==
- List of Rutaceae genera
