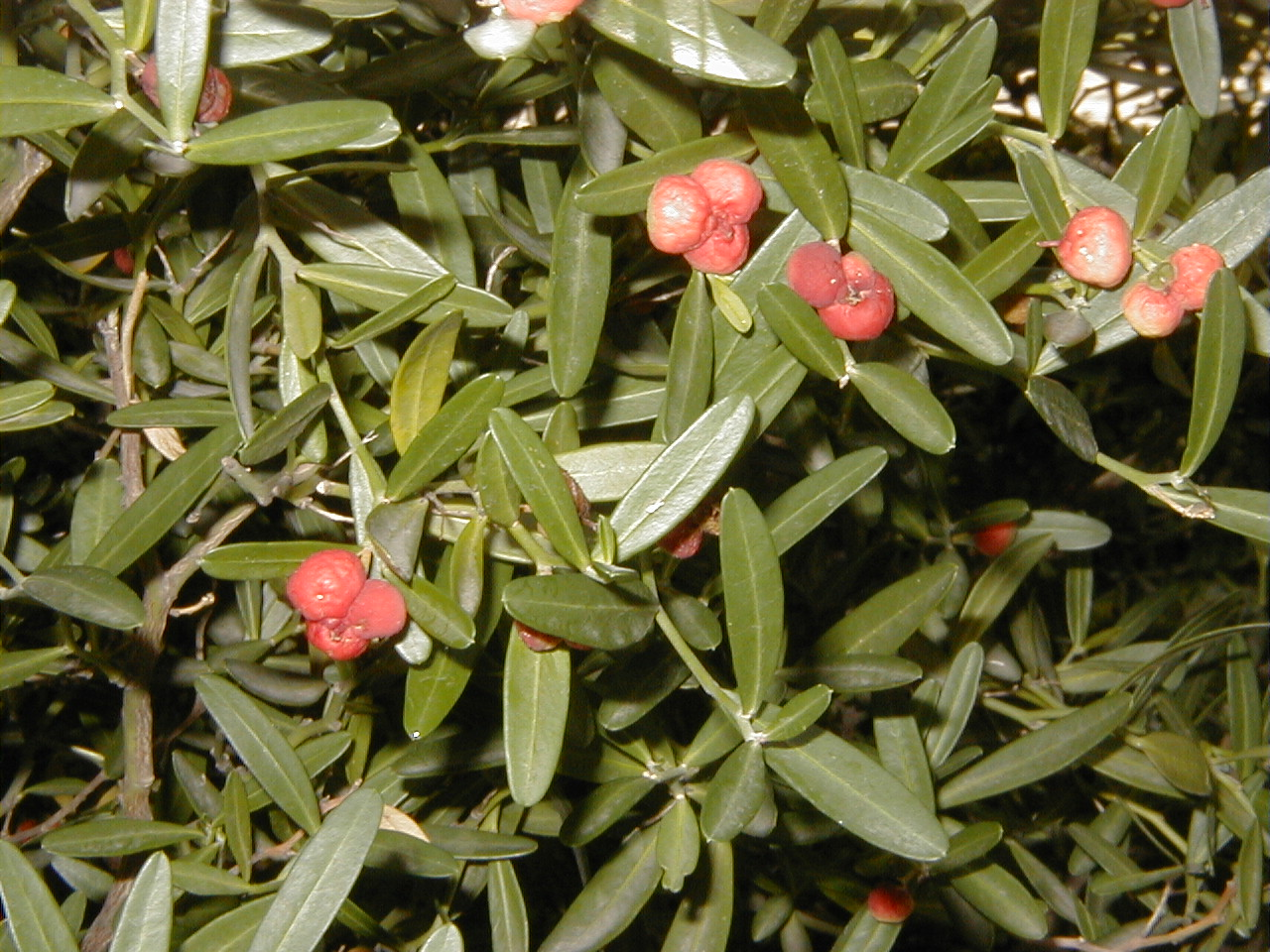
- Cneorum tricoccon

Scientific classification
- Kingdom: Plantae
- Clade: Tracheophytes
- Clade: Angiosperms
- Clade: Eudicots
- Clade: Rosids
- Order: Sapindales
- Family: Rutaceae
- Subfamily: Cneoroideae; Webb

Type genus
- Cneorum L.

Genera
- See text.

= Cneoroideae =

Subfamily of flowering plants

Cneoroideae is a subfamily of flowering plants that belongs to the family Rutaceae. The subfamilies Dictyolomatoideae and Spathelioideae are now included in the subfamily Cneoroideae.

== Taxonomy ==
In 1896, Engler published a division of the family Rutaceae into seven subfamilies. Two of Engler's monogeneric subfamilies, Dictyolomatoideae and Spathelioideae, are now included in the subfamily Cneoroideae, along with genera Engler placed in other families. The subfamily name Cneoroideae is attributed to Philip Barker-Webb in 1842.

=== Genera ===
Genera placed in Cneoroideae in a 2021 classification of the Rutaceae into subfamilies are:

- Bottegoa Chiov.
- Cedrelopsis Baill.
- Cneorum L.
- Dictyoloma A.Juss.
- Harrisonia R.Br. ex A.Juss.
- Ptaeroxylon Eckl. & Zeyh.
- Sohnreyia K.Krause
- Spathelia L.
