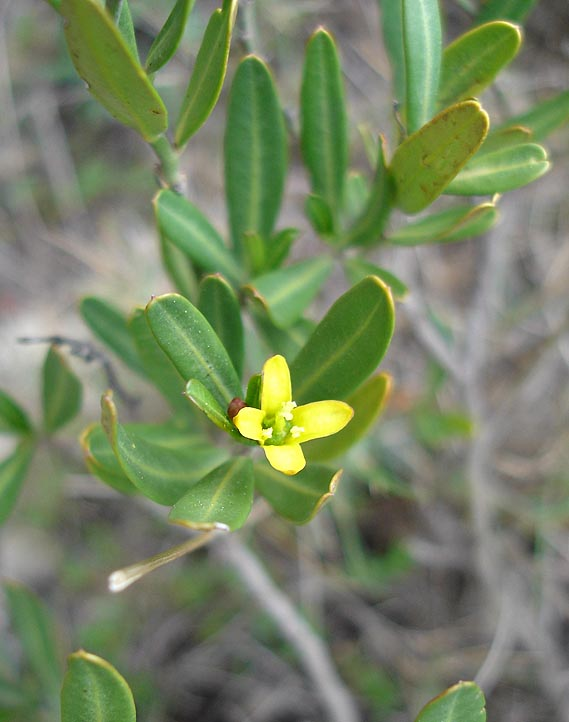

Scientific classification
- Kingdom: Plantae
- Clade: Tracheophytes
- Clade: Angiosperms
- Clade: Eudicots
- Clade: Rosids
- Order: Sapindales
- Family: Rutaceae
- Genus: Cneorum
- Species: C. tricoccon

Binomial name
- Cneorum tricoccon L.

Synonyms
- Chamaelea tricoccos (L.) Lam.; Cneorum trimerum (Urb.) Chodat; Cubincola trimera Urb.

= Cneorum tricoccon =

Species of flowering plant

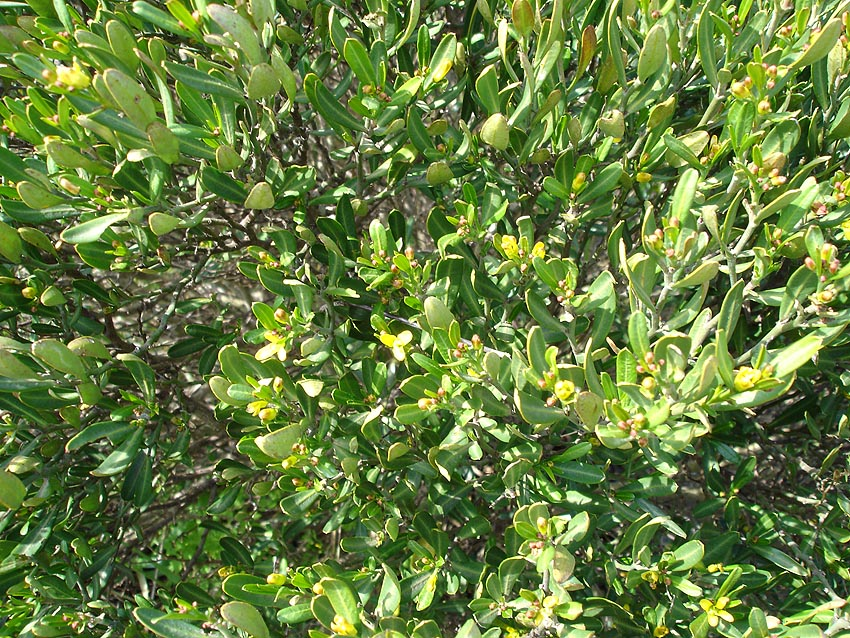

Cneorum tricoccon, the spurge olive, is a small shrub of the family Rutaceae, native to Europe in the western Mediterranean Region.

== Description ==
Cneorum tricoccon reaches an average of 0.6 metres (2.0 ft) in height and is in leaf all year. The plant which is nearly round and evergreen in color. The yellowish flowers occur from June to July, and their seeds ripen from August to September. The spurge olive plant is also hermaphroditic.

Cneorum tricoccon prefers light sandy soils that are common in the Mediterranean and also requires soils that drain particularly well. Spurge olive must have considerable sunlight to grow, and often stunts when in much of shade.

== Uses ==
Its fruit has no food value. The plant is rich in tannin, and can be used as a source of fuel.
